= Kaff al-Hammam =

Kaff al-Hammam كاف الحمام Kaf al-Hamam
- Village
- Location within Syria
- Coordinates: 35°3′1″N 35°56′8″E
- Country: Syria
- Governorate: Tartus
- District: Al-Shaykh Badr
- Subdistrict: Brummanet al-Mashayekh

Population (2004)
  - Total: 372
- Time zone: UTC+2 (EET)
  - Summer (DST): UTC+3 (EEST)

Kaff al-Hammam (Arabic: كاف الحمام, also spelled Kaf al-Hamam) is a village and suburb in northwestern Syria, administratively part of the Tartus Governorate, located southeast of Tartus. Nearby localities include Hammam Wasel to the northwest, al-Qadmus to the northeast, Hammam Qanyah and al-Riqama to the east, Brummanet al-Mashayekh to the southeast, al-Shaykh Badr to the south, Brummanet Raad to the southwest and al-Qamsiyah to the west. According to the Syria Central Bureau of Statistics, Kaff al-Hammam had a population of 372 in the 2004 census. The inhabitants of the village are predominantly Ismailis.
