= Tayru =

Village in Northwest Syria

Tayru طيرو
- Village
- Location within Syria
- Coordinates: 35°11′45″N 35°59′15″E
- Country: Syria
- Governorate: Tartus
- District: Baniyas
- Subdistrict: Baniyas

Population (2004 census)
  - Total: 838
- Time zone: UTC+2 (EET)
  - Summer (DST): UTC+3 (EEST)

Tayru (Arabic: طيرو) is a village in northwestern Syria, administratively part of the Tartus Governorate, located northeast of Tartus and just east of the Mediterranean town of Baniyas. Nearby localities include Bustan al-Hamam and al-Annazeh to the east, al-Qadmus and Kaff al-Jaa to the southeast, al-Qamsiyah, al-Baydah and Maten al-Sahel to the south. According to the Syria Central Bureau of Statistics, Tayru had a population of 838 in the 2004 census. Its inhabitants are predominantly Alawites.
