= Ayn Qadib =

Ayn Qadib عين قضيب
- Location in Syria
- Coordinates: 35°5′5″N 36°15′30″E
- Country: Syria
- Governorate: Tartus
- District: Baniyas
- Subdistrict: Qadmus

Population (2004)
  - Total: 630
- Time zone: UTC+3 (EET)
  - Summer (DST): UTC+2 (EEST)

Ayn Qadib (Arabic: عين قضيب; also spelled Ein Qadib) is a Syrian village in the al-Qadmus Subdistrict of the Baniyas District in Tartous Governorate. It is situated between Masyaf to the east and Kaf al-Jaa to the west. According to the Syria Central Bureau of Statistics (CBS), Ayn Qadib had a population of 630 in the 2004 census.
