= Niha, Tartus =

Niha النيحا
- Location in Syria
- Coordinates: 34°59′58″N 36°8′3″E
- Country: Syria
- Governorate: Tartus
- District: Shaykh Badr
- Subdistrict: Shaykh Badr

Population (2004)
  - Total: 1,182
- Time zone: UTC+3 (EET)
  - Summer (DST): UTC+2 (EEST)

Niha (Arabic: النيحا) is a Syrian village in the al-Shaykh Badr District in Tartous Governorate. It is situated between Wadi al-Uyun to the east, al-Shaykh Badr to the west. According to the Syria Central Bureau of Statistics (CBS), Niha had a population of 1,182 in the 2004 census.

== Economy ==
Many of the villagers work in agriculture, with the village's main agricultural products being wheat, tobacco and olives.
