= Brummanet Raad =

Brummanet Ra'ad برمانة رعد Burumaneh Raad
- Village
- Location within Syria
- Coordinates: 34°59′42″N 36°2′10″E
- Country: Syria
- Governorate: Tartus
- District: Al-Shaykh Badr
- Subdistrict: Al-Shaykh Badr
- Time zone: UTC+2 (EET)
  - Summer (DST): UTC+3 (EEST)

Brummanet Ra'ad (Arabic: برمانة رعد) is a village in northwestern Syria, administratively part of the Tartus Governorate, located southeast of Tartus in the al-Shaykh Badr District. The inhabitants of the village are predominantly Ismailis.

== Sources ==
- Balanche, Fabrice (2000). "Les Alaouites, l'espace et le pouvoir dans la région côtière syrienne : une intégration nationale ambiguë" (in French). Tours: Université François Rabelais.
