= Mqarmideh =

Mqarmideh المقرمدة
- Village
- Location in Syria
- Coordinates: 35°5′10″N 36°11′30″E
- Country: Syria
- Governorate: Tartus
- District: Baniyas District
- Subdistrict: al-Qadmus

Population (2004)
  - Total: 213
- Time zone: UTC+3 (EET)
  - Summer (DST): UTC+2 (EEST)
- City Qrya Pcode: C5417

Mqarmideh (Arabic: المقرمدة) is a Syrian village in the Baniyas District in Tartous Governorate. According to the Syria Central Bureau of Statistics (CBS), Mqarmideh had a population of 213 in the 2004 census.
