= Fneitiq =

Fneitiq فنيتق
- Village
- Location in Syria
- Coordinates: 35°6′51″N 36°7′7″E
- Country: Syria
- Governorate: Tartus
- District: Baniyas District
- Subdistrict: al-Qadmus

Population (2004)
  - Total: 1,021
- Time zone: UTC+3 (EET)
  - Summer (DST): UTC+2 (EEST)
- City Qrya Pcode: C5424

Fneitiq (Arabic: فنيتق) is a Syrian village in the Baniyas District in Tartous Governorate. According to the Syria Central Bureau of Statistics (CBS), Fneitiq had a population of 1,021 in the 2004 census.
