= Qarqafti =

Qarqafti قرقفتي
- Village
- Location in Syria
- Coordinates: 35°4′26″N 35°56′57″E
- Country: Syria
- Governorate: Tartus
- District: Baniyas District
- Subdistrict: Rawda

Population (2004)
  - Total: 927
- Time zone: UTC+3 (EET)
  - Summer (DST): UTC+2 (EEST)
- City Qrya Pcode: C5383

Qarqafti (Arabic: قرقفتي) is a Syrian village in the Baniyas District in Tartous Governorate. According to the Syria Central Bureau of Statistics (CBS), Qarqafti had a population of 927 in the 2004 census.
