= Bustan al-Najjar =

Bustan al-Najjar بستان النجار
- Village
- Location within Syria
- Coordinates: 35°9′49″N 35°57′13″E
- Country: Syria
- Governorate: Tartus
- District: Baniyas
- Subdistrict: Baniyas

Population (2004)
  - Total: 532
- Time zone: UTC+2 (EET)
  - Summer (DST): UTC+3 (EEST)

Bustan al-Najjar (Arabic: بستان النجار) is a village in northwestern Syria, administratively part of the Baniyas District of the Tartus Governorate, located southeast of Baniyas. According to the Syria Central Bureau of Statistics, Alqin had a population of 532 in the 2004 census.

== Sources ==
- Balanche, Fabrice (2000). Les Alaouites, l'espace et le pouvoir dans la région côtière syrienne : une intégration nationale ambiguë (Thesis) (in French). Tours: Université François Rabelais.
