= Brummanet al-Mashayekh =

Town in northwestern Syria

Brummanet al-Mashayekh برمانة المشايخ
- Town
- Location within Syria
- Coordinates: 35.017626°N 36.169457°E
- Country: Syria
- Governorate: Tartus
- District: al-Shaykh Badr
- Subdistrict: Brummanet al-Mashayekh

Population (2004 census)
  - Total: 3,666
- Time zone: UTC+2 (EET)
  - Summer (DST): UTC+3 (EEST)

Brummanet al-Mashayekh (Arabic: برمانة المشايخ) is a town in northwestern Syria, administratively part of the Tartus Governorate, located northeast of Tartus. Nearby localities include al-Annazeh, Maten al-Sahel and al-Shaykh Badr to the west, Kaff al-Jaa and al-Qadmus to the north and Wadi al-Oyun and Ayn Halaqim to the southeast. According to the Syria Central Bureau of Statistics (CBS), Brummanet al-Mashayekh had a population of 3,666 in the 2004 census.
