= List of towns and villages in Syria =

== Hama Governorate ==
=== Hama District ===
- Hama Subdistrict
- Suran Subdistrict
- Hirbnafsah Subdistrict
- Al-Hamraa Subdistrict

=== Masyaf District ===
- Masyaf Subdistrict
- Jubb Ramlah Subdistrict
- Awj Subdistrict
- Ain Halaqim Subdistrict
- Wadi al-Uyun Subdistrict

=== Mharda District ===
- Mharda Subdistrict
- Kafr Zita Subdistrict
- Karnaz Subdistrict

=== Salamiyah District ===
- Salamiyah Subdistrict
- Barri Sharqi Subdistrict
- Al-Saan Subdistrict
- Sabburah Subdistrict
- Uqayribat Subdistrict

=== Al-Suqaylabiyah District ===
- Al-Suqaylabiyah Subdistrict
- Tell Salhab Subdistrict
- Al-Ziyarah Subdistrict
- Shathah Subdistrict
- Qalaat al-Madiq Subdistrict

== Daraa Governorate ==
=== Daraa District ===
- Bosra
- Da'el
- Saham al-Jawlan

=== Izraa District ===
- al-Hirak

=== Al-Sanamayn District ===
- Burraq
- al-Harra
- Inkhil
- Jasim
- Kafr Shams
- Khabab
- Tubna

== Homs Governorate ==
=== Homs District ===
- Al-Riqama
- Fairouzeh
- Sadad
- Zaidal
- Al-Mushrifah

=== Talkalakh District ===
- Al-Hawash
- Ain al-Barda
- Marmarita
- Zweitina
- Amar al-Husn

=== Palmyra District ===
- al-Qaryatayn
- al-Sukhnah

== Latakia Governorate ==
=== Latakia District ===
- Al-Bahluliyah
- Rabia, Syria
- Ayn al-Bayda
- Qastal Ma'af
- Kessab
- Hanadi

=== Jableh District ===
- Ayn al-Sharqiyah
- Al-Qutailibiyah
- Ayn Shiqaq
- Daliyah
- Beit Yashout

=== Al-Haffah District ===
- Slinfah
- Ayn al-Tineh
- Kinsabba
- Muzayraa
- Salma
- Kfar Delbeh
- Tertyah
- Brouma
- Taouma
- Dwairke
- Kdeen
- Kafariyah

=== Qardaha District ===
- Bustan al-Basha
- Harf al-Musaytirah
- Al-Fakhurah
- Jawbat Burghal

== Rif Dimashq Governorate ==
=== Markaz Rif Dimashq ===
- al-Kiswah, Syria
- Babbila
- Jaramana
- Al-Malihah
- Kafr Batna
- Arbin
- Qudsaya

=== Douma District ===
- Harasta
- Sabaa Biyar
- Al-Dumayr
- Al-Nashabiyah
- Al-Ghizlaniyah
- Harran al-Awamid

=== Al-Qutayfah District ===
- Jayrud
- Maaloula
- Al-Ruhaybah
- Ras al-Khashufah

=== Al-Tall District ===
- Manin
- Saidnaya
- Rankous

=== Yabroud District ===
- Assal al-Ward

=== Al-Nabk District ===
- Deir Atiyah
- Qarah
- Al-Sehl

=== Al-Zabadani District ===
- Al-Dimas
- Ain al-Fijah
- Madaya, Syria
- Sirghaya
- Bloudan
- Maysalun
- Efra
- Hurayra

=== Qatana District ===
- Beit Jinn
- Sa'sa'
- Artouz

=== Darayya District ===
- Sahnaya
- Al-Hajar al-Aswad

== Tartus Governorate ==
=== Tartus District ===
- Arwad
- Al-Hamidiyah
- Khirbet al-Ma'zah
- Suda Khawabi
- Al-Karimah
- Al-Safsafah

=== Baniyas District ===
- Al-Rawda
- Al-Annazah
- Al-Qadmus
- Hammam Wasel
- Al-Tawahin
- Talin

=== Safita District ===
- Bayt al-Shaykh Yunis
- Mashta al-Helu
- Al-Bariqiyah
- Sibbeh
- Al-Sisiniyah
- Ras al-Khashufah

=== Duraykish District ===
- Junaynet Ruslan
- Hamin
- Dweir Ruslan

=== Ash-Shaykh Badr District ===
- Brummanet al-Mashayekh
- Al-Qamsiyah

== Quneitra Governorate ==
=== Quneitra District ===
- Khan Arnabah
- Khushniyeh
- Ein Qiniyye
- Majdal Shams
- Buq'ata
- Beer Ajam
- Ghajar
- Mas'ade

== A ==
- Al-Riqama
- Abu Faraj
- Ain al-Barda
- Ayn al-Kurum
- Amar al-Husn
- Amuda
- Al-Ariqah

== F ==
- Fairouzeh

== H ==
- Hurat Ammurin
- Al-Hawash

== I ==
- Imtan

== K ==
- Kafr Buhum
- Kfeir Yabous
- Al-Kafrun
- Khabab
- Al-Kharitah

== M ==
- Marmarita
- Mayadin
- Maharda
- Al-Mahfurah
- Al-Mishtaya
- Millis
- Mashrafet Al Mriej

== N ==
- Nahr al-Bared

== Q ==
- Qanawat
- Qara

== R ==
- Al-Raghib

== S ==
- Shaqqa
- Suran
- Souq Wadi Barada

== T ==
- Tell Tamer

== Z ==
- Zweitina
