= Kaff al-Jaa =

Kaff al-Jaa كاف الجاع
- Village
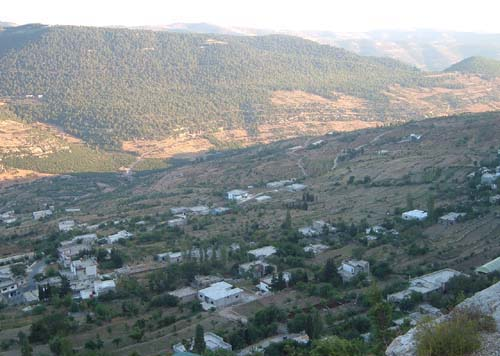
- A neighborhood of Kaff al-Jaa

- Location within Syria
- Coordinates: 35°5′8″N 36°12′26″E
- Country: Syria
- Governorate: Tartus
- District: Baniyas
- Subdistrict: Al-Qadmus

Population (2004 census)
  - Total: 2,068
- Time zone: UTC+2 (EET)
  - Summer (DST): UTC+3 (EEST)

Kaff al-Jaa (Arabic: كاف الجاع, pronounced Kāf al Jā`; also spelled Kaf al-Jaz and Caaf Aljaa) is a village in northwestern Syria, administratively part of the Tartus Governorate. Nearby localities include al-Qadmus to the west, Deir Mama to the northeast, Masyaf to the east, Wadi al-Oyun to the south and Hammam Wasel to the southwest. According to the Syria Central Bureau of Statistics, Kaff al-Jaa had a population of 2,068 in the 2004 census. Its inhabitants are predominantly Alawites.

The area is surrounded by mountains. The highest mountain of Kaff al-Jaa is the Alcaadboon, with a height of 1,194 meters.
