= Battle of Tawahin (978) =

Coordinates: 31°51′57.5″N 34°44′46.75″E

Date	15 August 978
Location	Al-Tawahin, Syria
Result	Fatımid victory: Fatimid rule over Syria restored

Belligerents
Fatimid Caliphate	Emirate of Damascus; Qarmatians

Commanders and leaders
al-Aziz Billah	Alptakin (POW); Al-Hasan al-A'sam

Strength
Unknown	Alptekin 300 followers, unknown Qarmat force

The Battle of Tawahin took place on 15 August 978 between the Fatimid army, led in person by Caliph al-Aziz, and the forces of Alptakin, the Turkic ruler of Damascus.

The battle followed a series of back-and-forth operations by both sides for control of Palestine and southern Syria during the previous years, in which Fatimid forces had advanced from Egypt, only to be defeated and thrown back by varying combinations of regional rivals. At Tawahin, Alptakin defeated the Fatimid left, but al-Aziz managed to break through the Daylamites holding the Turk's centre and right, winning the battle, and with it control of Syria. Alptakin was captured but treated honorably, and his Turkic and Daylamite soldiery, who had proven their worth against the Kutama Berbers who until then composed the bulk of the Fatimid military, were taken into Fatimid service. Augmented with these forces, the Fatimids were able to expand their rule over Syria in the following decade and enter into a conflict with the Byzantine Empire. The battle thus marked the beginning of the eclipse of the Kutama as the mainstay of the Fatimid Caliphate.

== Sources ==
- Gil, Moshe (1997) [1983]. A History of Palestine, 634–1099. Translated by Ethel Broido. Cambridge: Cambridge University Press. ISBN 0-521-59984-9.
- Halm, Heinz (2003). Die Kalifen von Kairo: Die Fatimiden in Ägypten, 973–1074 [The Caliphs of Cairo: The Fatimids in Egypt, 973–1074] (in German). Munich: C. H. Beck. ISBN 3-406-48654-1.
