= Birat al-Jurd =

Birat al-Jurd بيرة الجرد Biret al-Jard
- Village
- Location in Syria
- Coordinates: 34°57′48″N 36°16′18″E
- Country: Syria
- Governorate: Hama
- District: Masyaf
- Subdistrict: Wadi al-'Uyun

Population (2004)
  - Total: 1,670
- Time zone: UTC+3 (AST)

Birat al-Jurd (Arabic: بيرة الجرد, also spelled Biret al-Jard) is a village in northwestern Syria, administratively part of the Hama Governorate, located west of Hama. Nearby localities include Wadi al-Uyun to the northwest, al-Rusafa to the north, Baarin to the east, Ayn Halaqim to the southeast and Ayn al-Shams to the south, According to the Syria Central Bureau of Statistics, Birat al-Jurd had a population of 1,670 in the 2004 census.
