= Hosn Suleiman =

Village in Syria

Hosn Suleiman, temple of Zeus
- حصن سليمان (Arabic)
- Hosn Suleiman temple

- Location within Syria
- 34°55′49″N 36°14′43″E
- Location: Syria
- Region: Tartus Governorate

Hosn Suleiman (Arabic: حصن سليمان), a Syrian village, is found on the slope of the Al-Nabi Saleh mountain (جبل النبي صالح) at an altitude 950 m, at a distance of 20 km from Duraykish and 56 km from Tartous.

== History ==
Hosn Suleiman was known as Baetocaece which was famous for its slave market. The town had a temple of Zeus (بيت سيسي) and it is hinted from the naming that it bears semitic roots derived from Zeus's name. Also known as Baal (Bel) temple, ascribed to the god Baal. Still there is a village nearby called Betalous (بتعلوس). Baal was called also Baalous, and a Roman emperor existed as Elagabalus. The current naming is derived from King Solomon (سليمان).

The location was in close relation with Arwad kingdom (Arados) in the times of Phoenicians, and was a source of wood for the shipping industry. It was an important site during the Hellenic period, when Syria was part of the Seleucid Empire, and during the Roman period.

The 2nd century BC saw further building on the site on a monumental scale; the temple is built of some of the largest stone blocks in the region besides those at Baalbek. The temple was socially significant to its nearby area, as it owned large parts of the surrounding countryside. Upon the Christianisation of the Roman empire, the temple became a pilgrimage site, and Syro-Phoenician cult practices continued on the site.

Visitors can see the huge stones of the temple, with inscriptions in ancient Greek and Latin. Many of these inscriptions detail grants of privileges to the temple, first from Seleucus, then reiterated by Augustus, and affirmed by the now illegible inscription from Valerian and Gallienus. A letter from King Antiochus to his governor Euphemus provides insight into the role of the temple, saying:

I decided to grant him [Zeus] for all times… the village of Baetocaece, which previously Demetrius, the son of Demetrius, son of Mnasaeus owned in Tourgona in the satrapy of Apamea… so that the revenues it yields may be used for the monthly sacrifices and other expenses that concern the support of the sanctuary by the priest, who was appointed by the god, as is customary; monthly festivals shall be held, immune from tax, on every 15th and 30th of the month, the sanctuary shall be granted asylia, and no forces may be stationed in the village… If anyone acts against the above, he will be guilty of impiety.

== Gallery ==
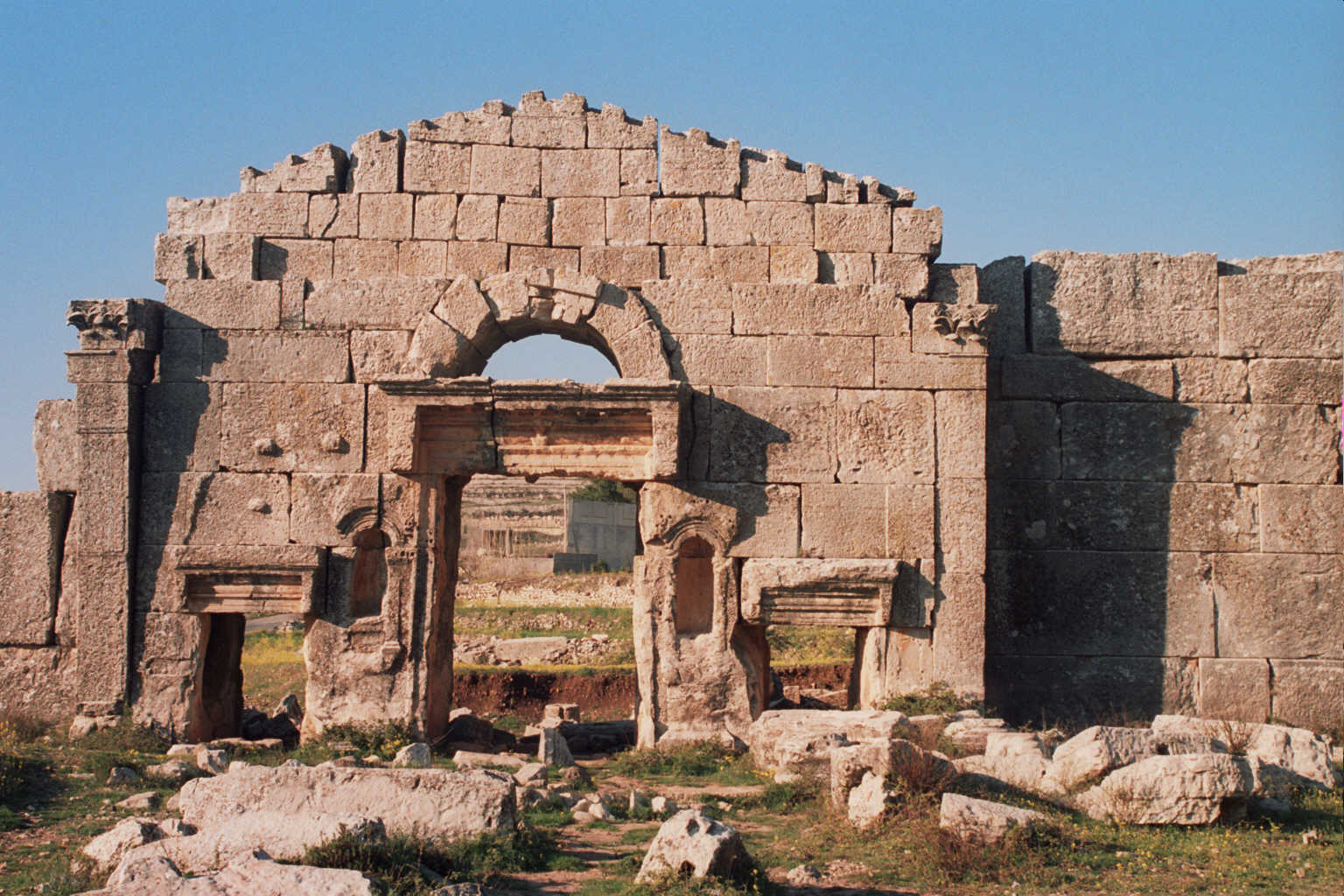
Hosn Suleiman

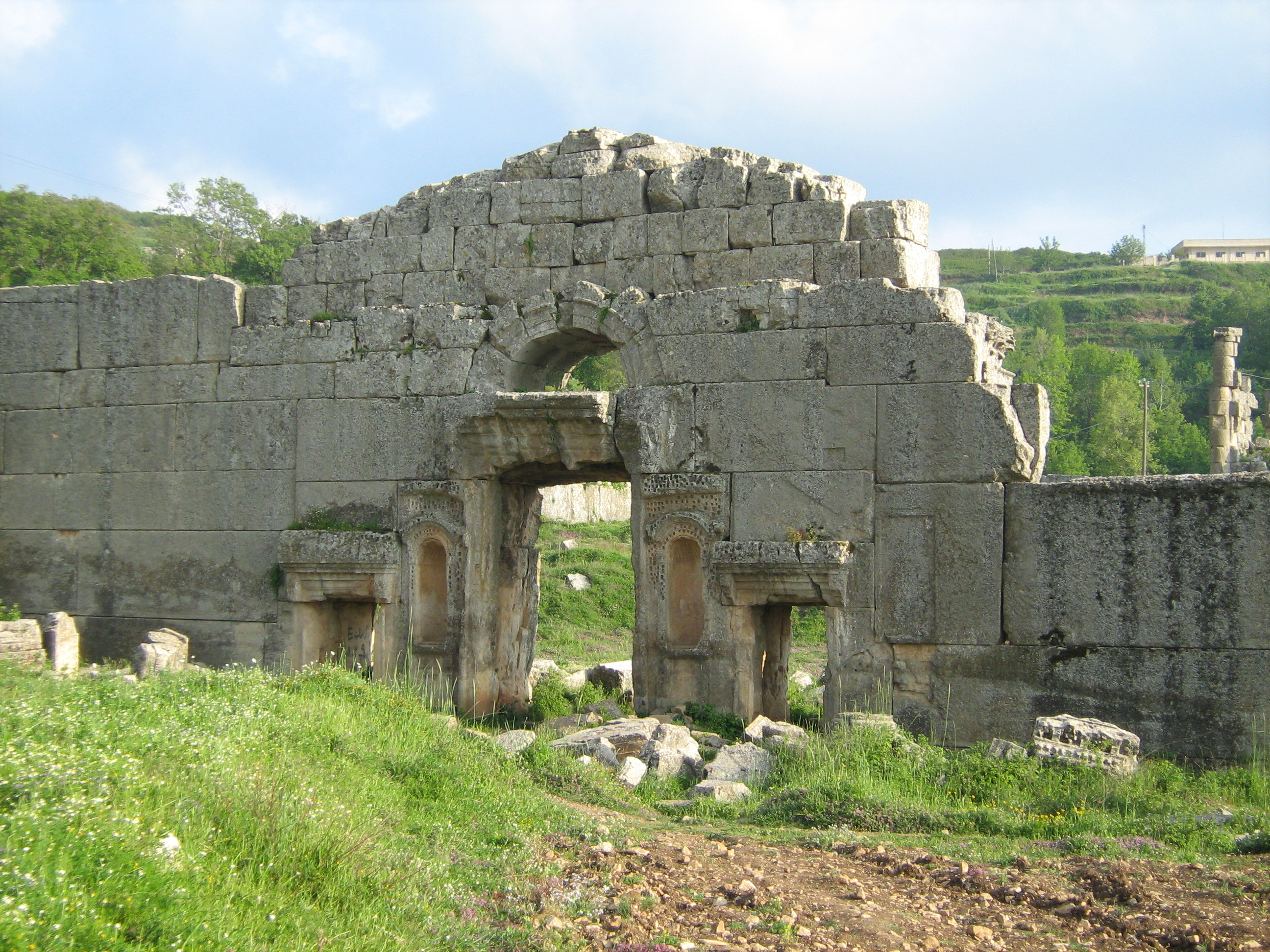
Panoramic view

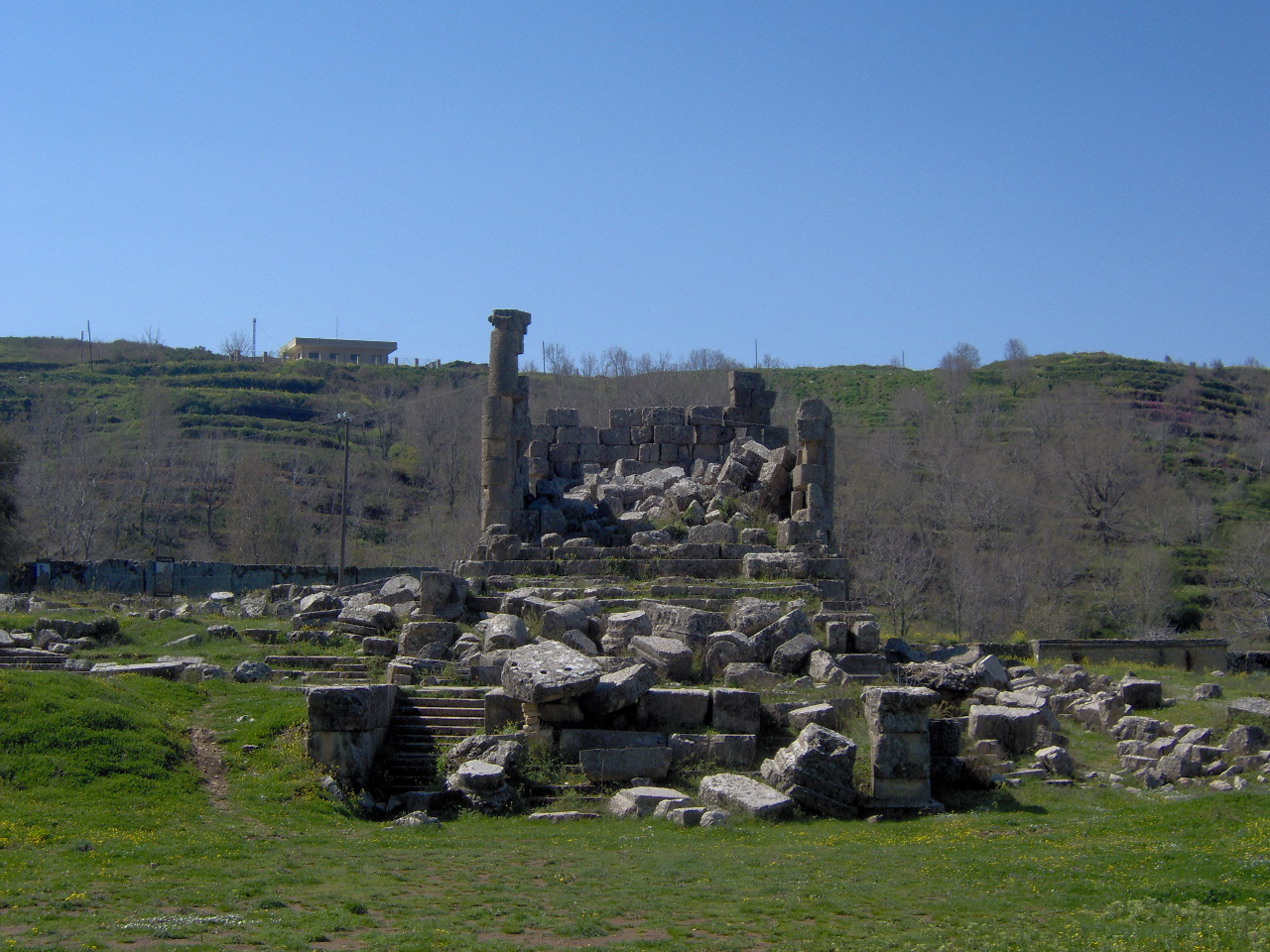
Ruins

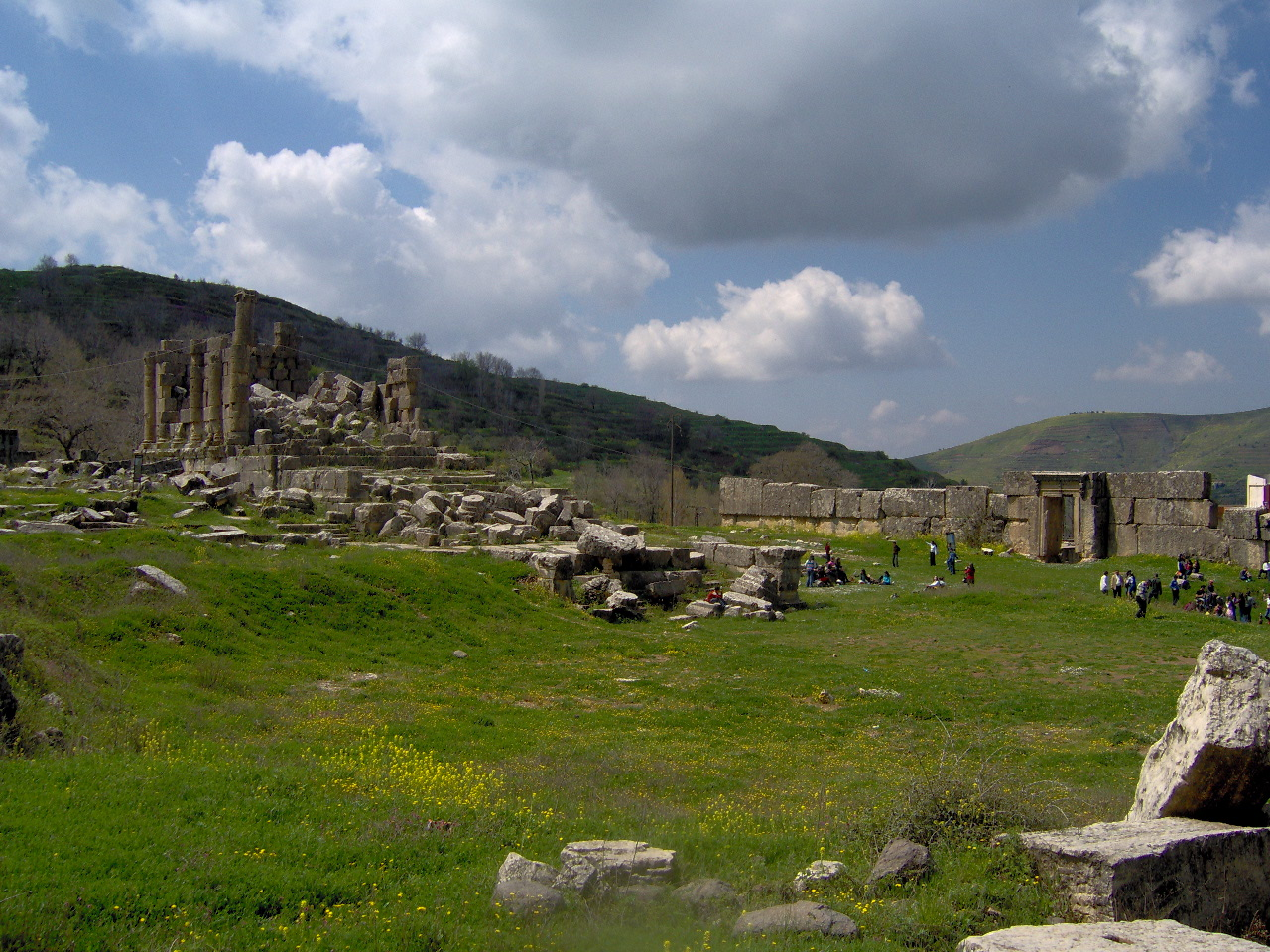
General view

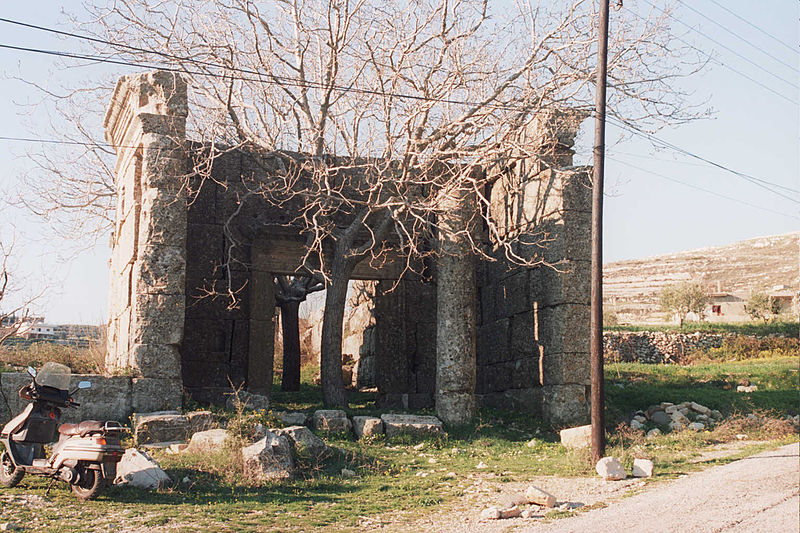
Part of a temple

== Bibliography ==
- Dignas, Beate (2002). Economy of the Sacred in Hellenistic and Roman Asia Minor. Oxford: OUP. pp. 74–84, 156ff.
- Freyberger, K.S. (2009). "Das Heiligtum in Baitokaike (Hössn Soleiman): Chronologie, Funktion und Bedeutung". Archäologischer Anzeiger (2): 265–292.
- Krencker, D.; Zschietzschmann, W. (1938). Römische Tempel in Syrien. Berlin. pp. 65–101.
- Kristensen, Troels Myrup (2020). "Space, Exchange and the Embedded Economies of Greek Sanctuaries". In Collar, Anna; Kristensen, Troels Myrup (eds.). Pilgrimage and Economy in the Ancient Mediterranean. Leiden: Brill. pp. 217–222. ISBN 9789004428690.
