= Hammam Wasel =

Town in northwestern Syria

Hammam Wasel حمام واصل
- Town
- Location within Syria
- Coordinates: 35°4′34″N 36°5′12″E
- Country: Syria
- Governorate: Tartus
- District: Baniyas
- Subdistrict: Hammam Wasel

Population (2004 census)
  - Total: 1,801
- Time zone: UTC+2 (EET)
  - Summer (DST): UTC+3 (EEST)

Hammam Wasel (Arabic: حمام واصل, also spelled Hamam Wasil) is a town in northwestern Syria, administratively part of the Tartus Governorate, located northeast of Tartus. Nearby localities include Ayn al-Sharqiyah and al-Baydah to the west, Baniyas to the northwest, Annaza to the north, and al-Qadmus to the northeast, Masyaf to the east, Wadi al-Oyun to the southeast, al-Shaykh Badr to the south and al-Qamsiyah to the southeast. According to the Syria Central Bureau of Statistics, Hammam Wasel had a population of 1,801 in the 2004 census. It is the administrative center of the Hammam Wasel nahiyah ("sub-district") which contained 12 localities with a collective population of 8,522 in 2004. The inhabitants are predominantly Alawites.

== Bibliography ==
- Boulanger, Robert (1966). The Middle East, Lebanon, Syria, Jordan, Iraq, Iran. Hachette.
