= Abu Faraj, Hama =

Village in Syria

Abu Faraj, Hama أبو فرج
- Village
- Location in Syria
- Coordinates: 35.312367°N 36.360219°E
- Country: Syria
- Governorate: Hama
- District: Al-Suqaylabiyah District
- Subdistrict: Tell Salhab

Population (2004)
  - Total: 834
- Time zone: UTC+3 (AST)
- City Qrya Pcode: C3148

Abu Faraj, Hama (Arabic: أبو فرج) is a Syrian village located in Tell Salhab Subdistrict in Al-Suqaylabiyah District, Hama. According to the Syria Central Bureau of Statistics (CBS), Abu Faraj, Hama had a population of 834 in the 2004 census.
