= Hurat Ammurin =

Village in Syria

Hurat Ammurin حورات عمورين
- Village
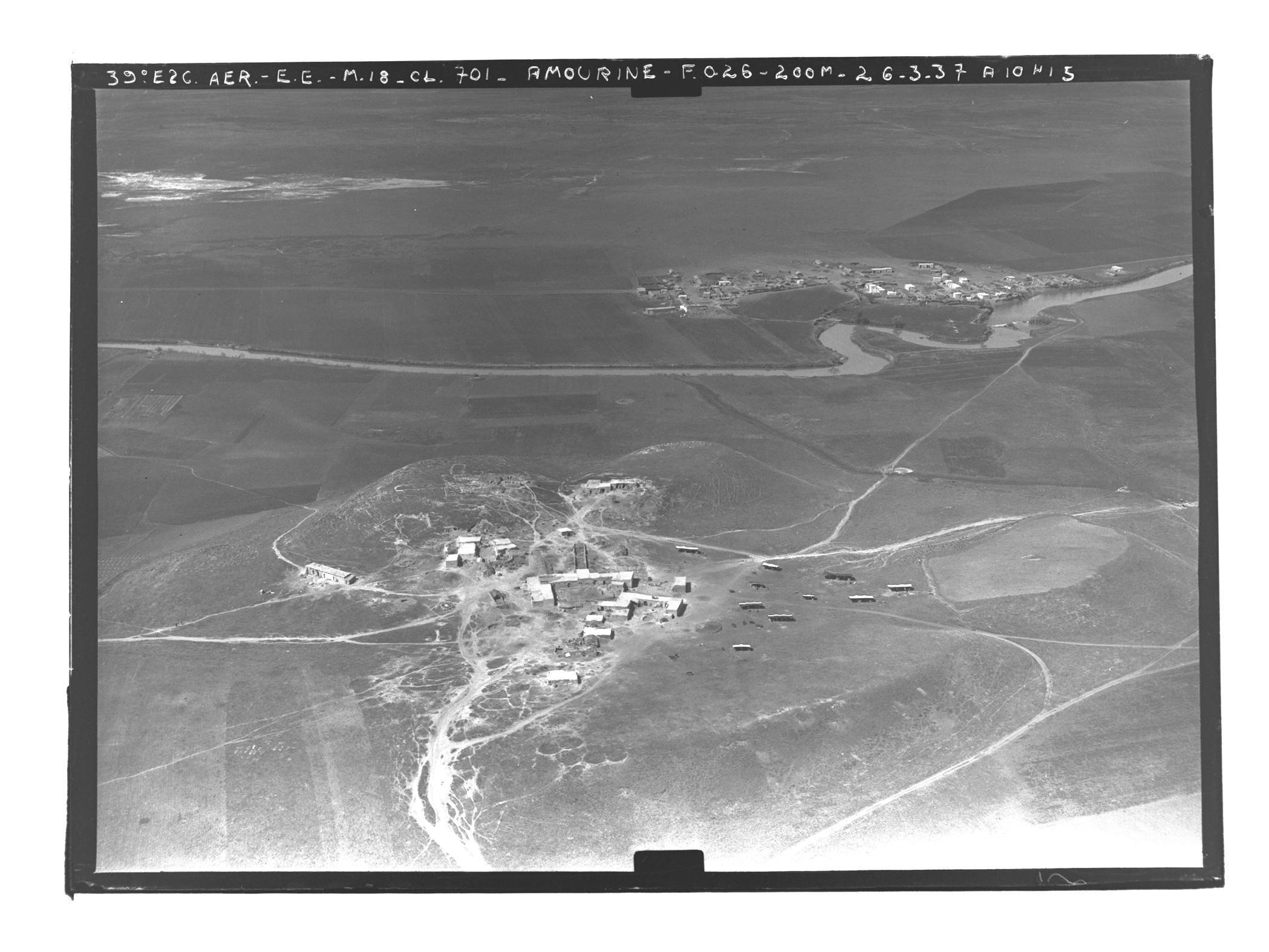
- 1937 aerial view of Hurat Ammurin

- Location in Syria
- Coordinates: 35.324212°N 36.370089°E
- Country: Syria
- Governorate: Hama
- District: Al-Suqaylabiyah District
- Subdistrict: Al-Suqaylabiyah Nahiyah

Population (2004)
  - Total: 3,143
- Time zone: UTC+3 (AST)
- City Qrya Pcode: C3122

Hurat Ammurin (Arabic: حورات عمورين) is a Syrian village located in Al-Suqaylabiyah Nahiyah in Al-Suqaylabiyah District, Hama. According to the Syria Central Bureau of Statistics (CBS), Hurat Ammurin had a population of 3,143 in the 2004 census. Its inhabitants are predominantly Alawites.
