= Junaynet Ruslan =

Village in Syria

Junaynet Ruslan جنينة رسلان
- Village
- Location in Syria
- Coordinates: 34°55′25″N 36°7′35″E
- Country: Syria
- Governorate: Tartus
- District: Duraykish
- Subdistrict: Junaynet Ruslan

Population (2004)
  - Total: 2,885
- Time zone: UTC+3 (EET)
  - Summer (DST): UTC+2 (EEST)
- City Qrya Pcode: C5593

Junaynet Ruslan (Arabic: جنينة رسلان) is a Syrian village in the Duraykish District in Tartous Governorate. According to the Syria Central Bureau of Statistics (CBS), Junaynet Ruslan had a population of 2,885 in the 2004 census.
