= Talin, Syria =

Town in northwestern Syria

Talin تالين Taleen
- Town
- Location within Syria
- Coordinates: 35°9′6″N 36°2′4″E
- Country: Syria
- Governorate: Tartus
- District: Baniyas
- Subdistrict: Talin

Population (2004 census)
  - Total: 3,699
- Time zone: UTC+2 (EET)
  - Summer (DST): UTC+3 (EEST)

Talin (Arabic: تالين, also spelled Taleen) is a town in northwestern Syria, administratively part of the Tartus Governorate, located between Baniyas (to the west) and al-Qadmus (to the east). It is situated in the Syrian Coastal Mountain Range. According to the Syria Central Bureau of Statistics, Talin had a population of 3,699 in the 2004 census. It is the administrative center of the Talin Subdistrict which contained five localities with a collective population of 8,351 in 2004. Its inhabitants are predominantly Alawites.
