= Dweir Ruslan =

Village in Syria

Dweir Ruslan دوير رسلان
- Village
- Location in Syria
- Coordinates: 34°58′9″N 36°13′53″E
- Country: Syria
- Governorate: Tartus
- District: Duraykish
- Subdistrict: Dweir Ruslan

Population (2004)
  - Total: 4,440
- Time zone: UTC+3 (EET)
  - Summer (DST): UTC+2 (EEST)
- City Qrya Pcode: C5610

Dweir Ruslan (Arabic: دوير رسلان) is a Syrian village in the Duraykish District in Tartous Governorate. According to the Syria Central Bureau of Statistics (CBS), Dweir Ruslan had a population of 4,440 in the 2004 census.
