= Bashraghi =

Bashraghi بشراغي
- Village
- Location in Syria
- Coordinates: 35°17′53″N 36°5′59″E
- Country: Syria
- Governorate: Latakia
- District: Jableh
- Subdistrict: Al-Qutailibiyah

Population (2004)
  - Total: 657
- Time zone: UTC+2 (EET)
  - Summer (DST): UTC+3 (EEST)

Bashraghi (Arabic: بشراغي) is a village in northwestern Syria, administratively part of the Jableh District of the Latakia Governorate. According to the Syria Central Bureau of Statistics, Bashraghi had a population of 657 in the 2004 census. Its inhabitants are Alawites and it is the historic home of the Bashaghira (also Bechargas) tribe, a faction of the Matawira confederation which took a leading part in the Alawite Revolt against French rule in 1920.

== Sources ==
- Balanche, Fabrice (2000). "Les Alaouites, l'espace et le pouvoir dans la région côtière syrienne : une intégration nationale ambiguë" (in French). Tours: Université François Rabelais.
- Bou-Nacklie, N. E. (1993). "Les Troupes Spéciales: Religious and Ethnic Recruitment, 1916–1946". International Journal of Middle East Studies. 25: 645–660. doi:10.1017/S0020743800059304.
