= Hamin, Syria =

Hamin حمين
- Village
- Location in Syria
- Coordinates: 34°54′4″N 36°2′24″E
- Country: Syria
- Governorate: Tartus
- District: Duraykish
- Subdistrict: Hamin

Population (2004)
  - Total: 2,222
- Time zone: UTC+3 (EET)
  - Summer (DST): UTC+2 (EEST)
- City Qrya Pcode: C5607

Hamin (Arabic: حمين, romanized: Hamīn) is a Syrian village in the Duraykish District in Tartous Governorate. According to the Syria Central Bureau of Statistics (CBS), Hamin had a population of 2,222 in the 2004 census. It is the center of the Hamin nahiya (subdistrict), which had a population of 9,922. The inhabitants of the village and the subdistrict are Alawites, predominantly from the Matawira tribal confederation. In 1960, the town had a population of 626.

== Sources ==
- Balanche, Fabrice (2000). "Les Alaouites, l'espace et le pouvoir dans la région côtière syrienne : une intégration nationale ambiguë" (in French). Tours: Université François Rabelais.
