= Al-Tawahin =

Town in northwestern Syria

Al-Tawahin الطواحين Tawaheen
- Town
- Location within Syria
- Coordinates: 35°7′44″N 36°13′19″E
- Country: Syria
- Governorate: Tartus
- District: Baniyas
- Subdistrict: Tawahin

Population (2004 census)
  - Total: 2,238
- Time zone: UTC+2 (EET)
  - Summer (DST): UTC+3 (EEST)

Al-Tawahin (Arabic: الطواحين, also spelled Tawaheen) is a town in northwestern Syria, administratively part of the Tartus Governorate, located east of Baniyas, northeast of al-Qadmus and northwest of Masyaf. It is situated in the Syrian Coastal Mountain Range. According to the Syria Central Bureau of Statistics, al-Tawahin had a population of 2,238 in the 2004 census. It is the administrative center of the Tawahin Subdistrict which contained nine localities with a collective population of 10,024 in 2004. Its inhabitants are predominantly Alawites.
