= Al-Qadmus =

Al-Qadmus القدموس Cadmus
- Town
- Location within Syria
- Coordinates: 35°6′5″N 36°9′40″E
- Country: Syria
- Governorate: Tartus
- District: Baniyas
- Subdistrict: Al-Qadmus
- Elevation: 850 m (2,780 ft)

Population (2004 census)
  - Total: 5,551
- Time zone: UTC+2 (EET)
  - Summer (DST): UTC+3 (EEST)

Al Qadmus on a foggy day.

Al-Qadmus (Arabic: القدموس, also spelled al-Qadmous or Cadmus) is a town in northwestern Syria, administratively part of the Tartus Governorate, located northeast of Tartus and 14 kilometres (8.7 miles) southeast of Baniyas. Nearby localities include Kaff al-Jaa and Masyaf to the east, Wadi al-'Uyun and al-Shaykh Badr to the south, Hammam Wasel, al-Qamsiyah and Maten al-Sahel to the southwest, Taanita to the west, al-Annazeh to the northwest and Deir Mama to the northeast. It is situated just east of the Mediterranean coast and its ruined castle stands on a plateau roughly 850 metres (2,790 feet) above sea level and just above the town.

According to the Syria Central Bureau of Statistics, al-Qadmus had a population of 5,551 in the 2004 census. It is the administrative center of the al-Qadmus nahiyah ("sub-district") which contained 25 localities with a collective population of 22,370 in 2004. The inhabitants of the town of al-Qadmus are mostly Ismailis and Alawites, with each community constituting about 50% of the population. By contrast, the villages in the surrounding countryside are predominantly (though not exclusively) inhabited by Alawites.

Al-Qadmus is home to an important medieval castle that served as the headquarters of the Isma'ili community in Syria, known as the Assassins during the Crusader era. Today, the castle is largely in ruins and, along with some scattered Ottoman-era houses throughout the town, serves as a tourist site. Al-Qadmus also contains a large mosque with an octagonal minaret. The town is also a center for tobacco production in Syria.

== Etymology ==
The city is named after Cadmus, who was a Phoenician prince known for introducing the original Alphabet or Phoenician alphabet—Φοινίκων γράμματα Phoinikōn grammata, "Phoenician letters"— to the Greeks.

== Climate ==
In Al Qadmus, the climate is warm and temperate. In winter there is much more rainfall in Al Qadmus than in summer. The Köppen-Geiger climate classification is Csa. The average annual temperature in Al Qadmus is 16.2 °C (61.2 °F). About 1,286 mm (50.63 in) of precipitation falls annually.

Climate data for Al-Qadmus
Month	Jan	Feb	Mar	Apr	May	Jun	Jul	Aug	Sep	Oct	Nov	Dec	Year
Mean daily maximum °C (°F)	10.2 (50.4)	11.4 (52.5)	14.9 (58.8)	19.9 (67.8)	24.2 (75.6)	27.1 (80.8)	28.4 (83.1)	29.3 (84.7)	27.7 (81.9)	24.3 (75.7)	18.4 (65.1)	12.5 (54.5)	20.7 (69.2)
Mean daily minimum °C (°F)	3.5 (38.3)	4.2 (39.6)	6.2 (43.2)	9.2 (48.6)	13.0 (55.4)	17.1 (62.8)	19.9 (67.8)	20.3 (68.5)	17.1 (62.8)	13.4 (56.1)	9.1 (48.4)	5.1 (41.2)	11.5 (52.7)
Average precipitation mm (inches)	249 (9.8)	217 (8.5)	191 (7.5)	111 (4.4)	40 (1.6)	7 (0.3)	1 (0.0)	3 (0.1)	18 (0.7)	57 (2.2)	117 (4.6)	275 (10.8)	1,286 (50.5)
Average snowy days	3	2	0	0	0	0	0	0	0	0	0	1	6
Source: Weather Online, Weather Base, BBC Weather and My Weather 2, Climate data

== History ==
=== Medieval period ===
The fortress of al-Qadmus was captured by Bohemond I of Antioch in 1129. In 1130-1131 it was recaptured by local Muslim forces. The fortress was later sold to the Isma'ili (known then as the Assassins) sect in 1132 by the Muslim emir of al-Kahf, Sayf al-Mulk ibn Amrun. By 1167 the scholar Benjamin of Tudela wrote that al-Qadmus served as the principal seat of the Assassins. Although details are few, al-Qadmus changed hands between the Assassins and the Crusaders a few more times, before being firmly under the control of the former.

Al-Qadmus was captured and annexed to the Mamluk Sultanate by Baibars in 1273. It was still controlled by the Ismailis, albeit as loyal subjects to the sultanate, during the intermittent reign of Sultan an-Nasir Muhammad (1294-1340). When North African scholar Ibn Battuta visited al-Qadmus in 1355, during Mamluk rule, noting that it was part of the niyabah ("governorship") of Masyaf, a dependency of Tripoli. Later this governorship was detached from Tripoli and transferred to Damascus province when it was visited by al-Qalqashandi in 1412. Taxes on cotton cloth and silk were abolished in the district of al-Qadmus by various Mamluk sultans in the late 15th century.

=== Ottoman era ===
In 1683, during the Ottoman period, Muslim scholar Abd al-Ghani al-Nabulsi visited al-Qadmus and noted the emir of the fortress belonged to the Tanukhi clan, an Arab tribe that originally settled in the Batanea area of southern Syria during Byzantine rule and migrated northwards.

In the 1830s Ibrahim Pasha of Egypt destroyed the fortress of al-Qadmus during the Khedivate Egyptian invasion of the Levant. Al-Qadmus was the seat of Ismaili power at the time. It was also the center of a district which contained 177 villages. The leading families of the town, and the ones where the emirs hailed from, were the Hejawiyah and the Suwaydaniya. In the 1840s the Ismaili chief of al-Qadmus successfully lobbied the Ottoman authorities to allow Ismaili resettlement of the abandoned town of Salamiyah, east of Hama. Pressure from the surrounding Alawite heartland caused many to emigrate for Salamiyah, although the town maintained its political and economic significance in the region and served a commanding role in the central Coastal Mountain Range, similar to that played by Safita. Al-Qadmus's inhabitants specialized in commerce and artisan crafts. The town was a destination for farmers from al-Annazah, Talin and al-Shaykh Badr and exported the agricultural products of the area to major cities like Hama, Tripoli and Beirut.

While most of the Ismailis in Syria transferred their allegiance to the Qasim Shahi line of Aga Khan III in 1887, the Ismailis of Qadmus and Masyaf remained affiliated with the Muhammad Shahi line. They are known as the "Ja'afariya" sect and by the 1990s they numbered around 15,000. The quarter in Salamiyah where many of al-Qadmus' inhabitants had settled was named "al-Qadamisa," after the town of their origin.

=== Modern era ===
In December 1918, during the Syrian Coastal Revolt led by Saleh al-Ali against the occupying French authorities, French forces stationed at al-Qadmus attempted to launch an attack against al-Ali's stronghold in nearby al-Shaykh Badr. Al-Ali and his forces engaged and defeated the French near the village of Wadi al-Oyun. Because the Ismaili leadership in al-Qadmus had allied themselves with the French, al-Ali assaulted the town soon afterward. French forces came to aid their allies, but were defeated a second time on 21 February 1919. By July 1919 the French and al-Ali concluded a peace agreement, but it was violated by the former when, from their base in al-Qadmus, they burned down the village of Kaff al-Jaz. Subsequently, al-Ali launched a counterattack against al-Qadmus.

Prior to the ascent of the Baathist government in 1963, the built-up areas of al-Qadmus was largely concentrated just south and east of the citadel, where most houses were built closely together. This area contained the old souk ("market") and the Ismaili mosque. In the 1970s and 1980s, during the presidency of Hafez al-Assad, the town expanded northward towards the east-west road connecting Masyaf and Baniyas. The intersection of this highway has become the commercial center of the town. Tourism-centered development spearheaded by private contractors began in the late 1980s, mostly concentrated north of the fortress, east of the town's main thoroughfare and south of the east-west highway. The area attracts vacationers mostly from other parts of Syria, including a high proportion of Ismailis from other cities.

Al-Qadmus's political and socio-economic position in the central coastal mountains region significantly decreased after 1970. This was in part due to the promotion of nearby al-Shaykh Badr to a district center that year, which shifted the focus away from al-Qadmus, with villagers in the area going to al-Shaykh Badr for services. Moreover, the gradual development and improvement of transportation infrastructure between Baniyas and its hinterland made it easier for the people of Hammam Wasel, al-Annazah and Talin to travel to Baniyas instead of al-Qadmus.

In early July 2005 confessional violence broke out between some of the Ismaili and Alawite residents of al-Qadmus. The clashes were apparently started after a few young Alawite men began speaking to Ismaili women to the consternation of the latter's male relatives. When the relatives complained to the town's Alawite police commander, he refrained from becoming involved in the dispute. Many in the Alawite community subsequently boycotted Ismaili-owned businesses in al-Qadmus, particularly the furniture stores and sweet shops, and instead opted to purchase from the surrounding markets. The local Ismaili merchants were angered at the severe decrease in their business's profits as a result of the boycott and began hurling stones at Alawite-owned storefronts. Later that evening some Alawite residents retaliated by ransacking and burning down 27 Ismaili-owned businesses, causing damage worth an estimated LS 10 million. A 75-year-old man from the town was killed in the violence and 13 others were wounded. The clashes ended when two Syrian Army battalions from nearby military bases closed the roads leading to al-Qadmus and detained and questioned about 500 suspects. A civilian delegation from al-Qadmus met with Syrian president Bashar al-Assad in an attempt to relieve tensions in the town. The Alawite nahiyah ("sub-district") chief of al-Qadmus was replaced by a Christian who was seen as neutral.

== See also ==
- Awaru
- List of castles in Syria

== Bibliography ==
- Ainsworth, W. Harrison, ed. (1852). The New Monthly Magazine and Humorist. Vol. 94. Chapman and Hall.
- Bosworth, Clifford Edmund (1989). The Encyclopaedia of Islam: Fascicules 111-112 : Masrah Mawlid, Parts 111-112. BRILL. ISBN 9789004092396.
- Daftary, Farhad (1992). The Isma'Ilis: Their History and Doctrines. Cambridge University Press. ISBN 0521429749.
- Daftary, Farhad (1998). A Short History of the Ismailis: Traditions of a Muslim Community. Edinburgh University Press. ISBN 0748609040.
- Daftary, Farhad (2007). The Isma'ilis: Their History and Doctrines. Cambridge University Press. ISBN 978-0521850841.
- Holt, Peter Malcolm (1995). Early Mamluk Diplomacy, 1260-1290: Treaties of Baybars and Qalāwūn with Christian Rulers. BRILL. ISBN 9004102469.
- Jidejian, Nina (1980). Tripoli Through the Ages. Dar el-Mashreq Publishers. ISBN 9782721458360.
- Lee, Jess (2010). Syria Handbook. Footprint Travel Guides. ISBN 978-1907263033.
- Lyde, Samuel (1860). The Asian Mystery Illustrated in the History, Religion, and Present State of the Ansaireeh Or Nusairis of Syria. Longman. "Kadmoos Syria."
- Moosa, Matti (1987). Extremist Shiites: The Ghulat Sects. Syracuse University Press. ISBN 0-8156-2411-5.
- Raphael, Kate (2011). Muslim Fortresses in the Levant: Between Crusaders and Mongols. Taylor & Francis US. ISBN 978-0415569255.
- Shora, Nawar (2008). The Arab-American Handbook: A Guide to the Arab, Arab-American, and Muslim Worlds. Cune Press. ISBN 978-1885942142.
- Sluglett, Peter (2010). Syria and Bilad al-Sham under Ottoman Rule: Essays in Honour of Abdul Karim Rafeq. BRILL. ISBN 978-9004181939.
- Stevenson, William Barron (1907). The Crusaders in the East: A Brief History of the Wars of Islam with the Latins in Syria During the Twelfth and Thirteenth Centuries. Cambridge University Press. "barin hama."
