= Duraykish =

City in Syria

Duraykish دريكيش
- City
- Location in Syria
- Coordinates: 34°53′49.02″N 36°08′04.61″E
- Country: Syria
- Governorate: Tartus
- District: Duraykish
- Subdistrict: Duraykish
- Elevation: 400 m (1,300 ft)

Population (2004)
  - Total: 13,244

Duraykish (Arabic: دريكيش, romanized: Duraykīsh, also transliterated Dreikiche or Dreykish) is a city in western Syria, in the Tartus Governorate, at a distance of about 32 kilometers (20 mi) east of Tartus. The name 'Dreikiche' derives from Latin and means "three caves". The town is famous for its mineral water springs located to the south of the city. The mineral water of the town is bottled and sold under the label 'Dreikiche'. Its inhabitants are mostly Alawites.

== Geography ==
The city sits on a hillside, near the opening of two valleys, with the older part of town divided into two parts by an elevation of about 100 meters (330 ft). The average elevation of old Duraykish is between 340 meters (1,120 ft) and 480 meters (1,570 ft) above sea level. The commercial center of old Duraykish is on the east side of the city. The newer, lower part of town, al-Maqla'a, is situated about 500 meters (1,600 ft) below the city center.

== History ==
Duraykish was the largest Alawite community in the Syrian Coastal Mountain Range from the mid-19th century until the 1960s. As a village of roughly 1,000 inhabitants, Duraykish was chosen as the headquarters of Isma'il Bey, a chief of the Matawira, an Alawite tribal confederation, when he established control over the southern part of the coastal range under the Ottomans, who appointed him the governor of the Safita kaza (district). This relatively short period, which ended with Isma'il Bey's assassination by rival chiefs, when Duraykish served as a regional seat of power, is partly credited by historian Fabrice Balanche as the foundation of its economic and demographic preeminence over other Alawite towns into the mid-20th century.

In 1970, together with Qardaha and al-Shaykh Badr, Duraykish became the first Alawite settlement to gain city status in Syria. Its local prominence, the residents' relatively high level of education due to the existence of a high school and teacher's school in the town, its active souk (bazaar), growing tourism, and some of the residents' connections with the top members of the government of the ruling Ba'ath Party at the time all contributed to its elevated official status.

In the mid-1970s, the Ministry of Industry constructed a mineral water processing facility and silk spinning mill in Duraykish. State investments during this period helped spur an annual average population growth of 4.2% between 1970 and 1981, outpacing prior periods and the regional average of 3.8%. The al-Maqla'a part of the city developed in the 1980s and became home to newcomers from the surrounding villages, nine of which were incorporated into Duraykish in 1983; people from the surrounding villages constituted 90% of al-Maqla'a's residents. According to Balanche, since the incorporation, city politics and planning have often been characterized by the struggle between the original urban dwellers and the rural newcomers. The steep slopes around much of Duraykish prevent the original settlement from expanding. This left the area which became al-Maqla'a, located at the junction of the road connections with Safita (to the south) and Tartus (to the east), as the focus of development. This areas hosts most of the city's newer commercial businesses.

By the 1980s, the tourism stemming from Duraykish's mineral water sources began to diminish and the city also became less favored by visitors, who preferred the nearby, more modernized summer resort towns of Mashta al-Helu and Wadi al-Uyun. The large government-owned hotel in the city was closed in 1987, while the private hotels and private home rentals were generally considered uncomfortable by visitors. Following demand by the city's inhabitants, the government inaugurated an Arab cultural center in Duraykish. In contrast to the initial boom in the decade following its promotion as a city, growth in Duraykish had slowed and the city experienced negative net migration at least during the 1980s and 1990s. Balanche attributes this decline to the state's top-down model of development and management of tourism and silk-processing in the city, which he considers stifling to private enterprise there.

== Sources ==
- Balanche, Fabrice (2000). "Les Alaouites, l'espace et le pouvoir dans la région côtière syrienne : une intégration nationale ambiguë" (in French). Tours: Université François Rabelais.
