= Wadi al-Uyun =

Wadi al-Uyun وادي العيون Wadi al-Oyun
- Town
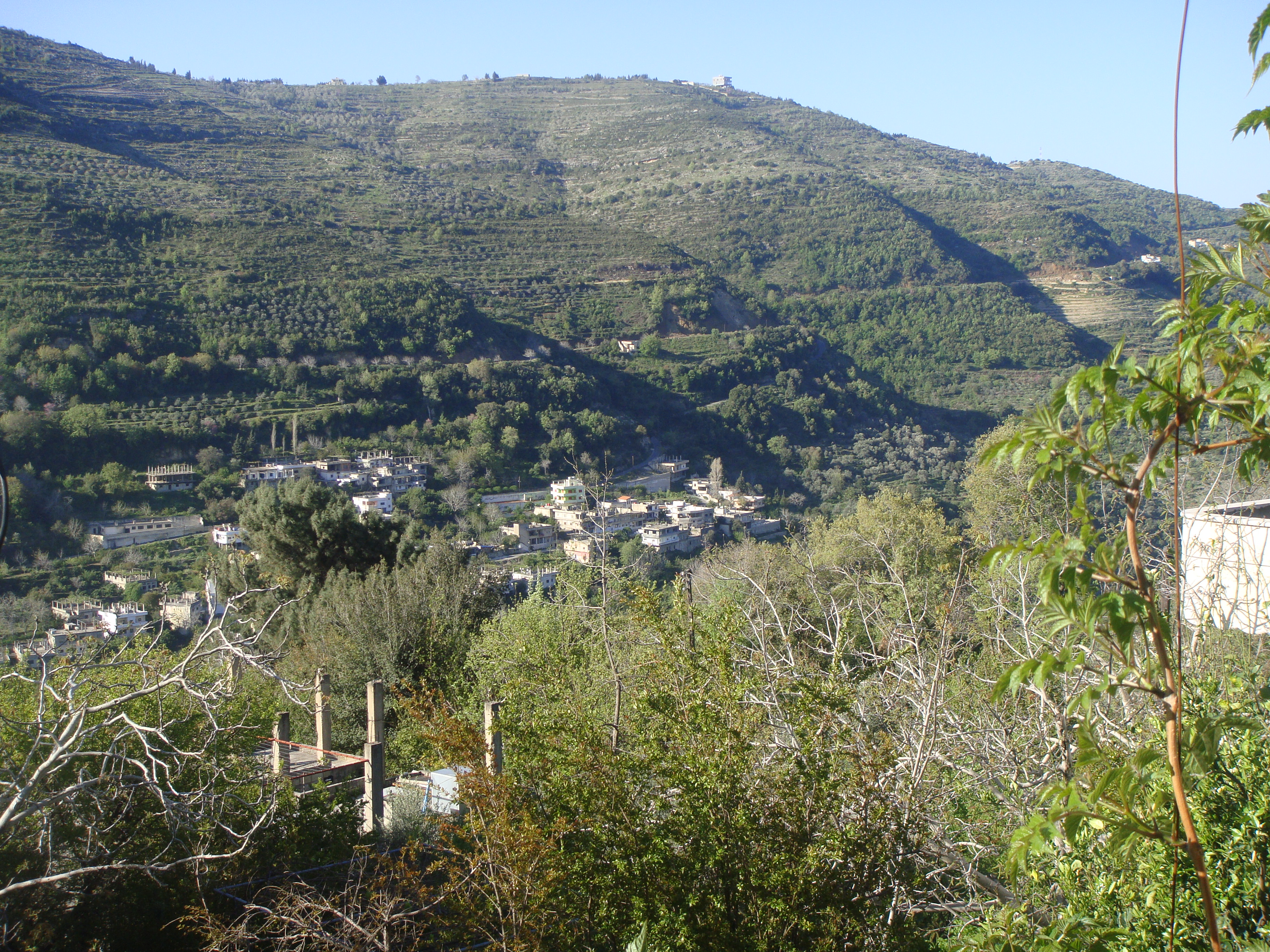
- View of Wadi al-Uyun, 2010

- Location in Syria
- Coordinates: 34°59′50″N 36°11′26″E
- Country: Syria
- Governorate: Hama
- District: Masyaf
- Subdistrict: Wadi al-Uyun

Population (2004)
  - Town: 3,371
  - Metro: 12,951
- Time zone: UTC+3 (AST)

Wadi al-'Uyun (Arabic: وادي العيون, also spelled Wadi al-Oyun, Wady Aloyon, or Wadi al-Ayun; transliteration: "Valley of the Springs") is a town in northwestern Syria, administratively part of the Hama Governorate, located west of Hama.

According to the Syria Central Bureau of Statistics, Wadi al-'Uyun had a population of 3,371 in the 2004 census. It is the administrative center of the subdistrict, which consists of 21 localities with a combined population of 12,951 in 2004. The village had a population of around 1,000 in the early 1960s. The inhabitants of the town are predominantly Alawites.

Wadi al-'Uyun is a tourist attraction for Syrians. Visitors come for the area's scenery, including the numerous springs, waterfalls, and green algae, which heavily covers the rocks and floors of the area. The latter characteristic lends the area the alternative name of the "Green Hat." A distinguishing feature the waterfalls of Wadi al-'Uyun have as compared to similar sites throughout Syria is the visitors' ability to touch and play in the waterfall and climb up its rocks.

== History ==
The village and the valley in which it lies are known for numerous small springs, from which Wadi al-Uyun receives its name. In 1832, when Ibrahim Pasha of Egypt conquered the Levant from the Ottoman Empire, he recruited a Druze force to subjugate the Alawites of the Coastal Mountain Range. However, Alawite militias captured the Druze force and executed all 500 of them at a rock in Wadi al-Uyun. Until the present day, the place where they were killed is known as the "Blood Rock."

In late September 2012, during the Syrian civil war, the deputy chief of staff of the rebel Free Syrian Army (FSA), Arif al-Hamud, stated that during a battle between rebels and pro-government forces in Darat Izza, near Aleppo, FSA fighters killed around 40 alleged members of the shabiha militia from Wadi al-'Uyun. In early October 2012, the pan-Arab daily Al-Sharq al-Awsat reported that clashes had taken place in Wadi al-'Uyun between its Alawite residents and government forces. The report quoted opposition activists who stated the town's residents were angry with the government for the burial of several of its men who had died "in recent events." The residents accused the government of "killing their sons and embroiling them in the violent confrontations with the Syrian people."

== Geography ==
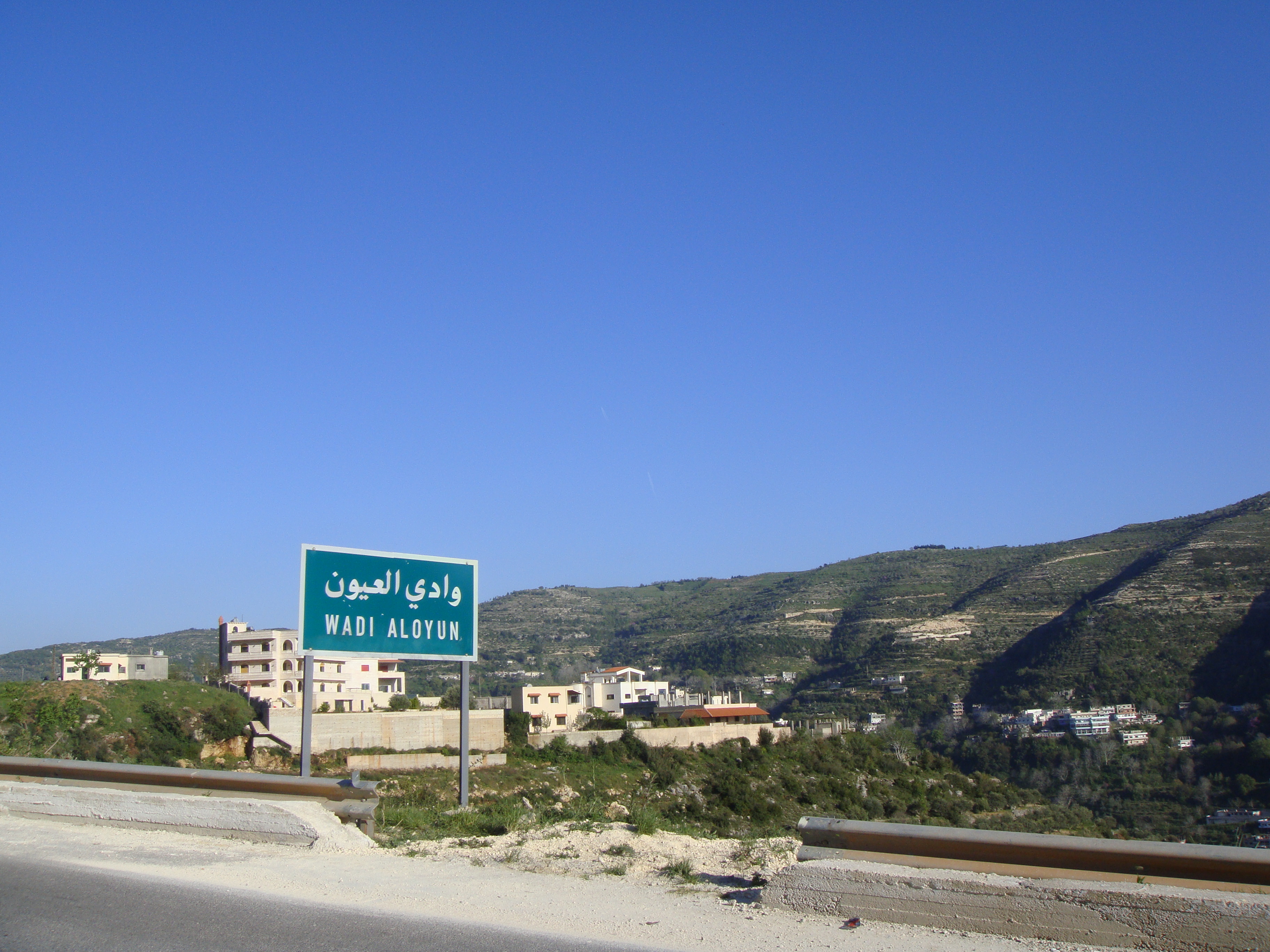
Roadside view of Wadi al-Oyun

Wadi al-'Uyun is spread over a large east-west area in the foothills of the Coastal Mountain Range, with built-up areas scattered on both sides of a valley with the same name. Elevations in the town vary between 450 and 900 meters above sea level. Many of its houses are situated on escarpments. The village is abundant in mulberry orchards.

Nearby localities include al-Shaykh Badr to the west, Brummanet al-Mashayekh to the northwest, al-Raqmah and Qadmus to the north, Rusafa, Masyaf, and al-Bayda to the northeast, Birat al-Jurd and Ayn Halaqim to the southeast, Mashta al-Helu to the south, and Duraykish to the southwest.

== Bibliography ==
- Boulanger, Robert (1966). The Middle East, Lebanon, Syria, Jordan, Iraq, Iran. Hachette.
- Moosa, Matti (1987). Extremist Shiites: The Ghulat Sects. Syracuse University Press. ISBN 0-8156-2411-5.
