= Al-Qamsiyah =

Town in northwestern Syria

Al-Qamsiyah القمصيّة
- Town
- Location within Syria
- Coordinates: 35.050323°N 35.996143°E
- Country: Syria
- Governorate: Tartus
- District: al-Shaykh Badr
- Subdistrict: al-Qamsiyah

Population (2004 census)
  - Total: 2,244
- Time zone: UTC+2 (EET)
  - Summer (DST): UTC+3 (EEST)

Al-Qamsiyah (Arabic: القمصية, romanized: al-Qamṣīyah) is a town in northwestern Syria, administratively part of the Tartus Governorate, located north of Tartus. Nearby localities include al-Annazeh, Maten al-Sahel and Husayn al-Baher to the southwest and Khawabi, Khirbet al-Faras and al-Shaykh Badr to the southeast. According to the Syria Central Bureau of Statistics (CBS), al-Qamsiyah had a population of 2,244 in the 2004 census. Its inhabitants are predominantly Alawites.
