= Al-Annazah =

Al-Annazah العنازة
- Village
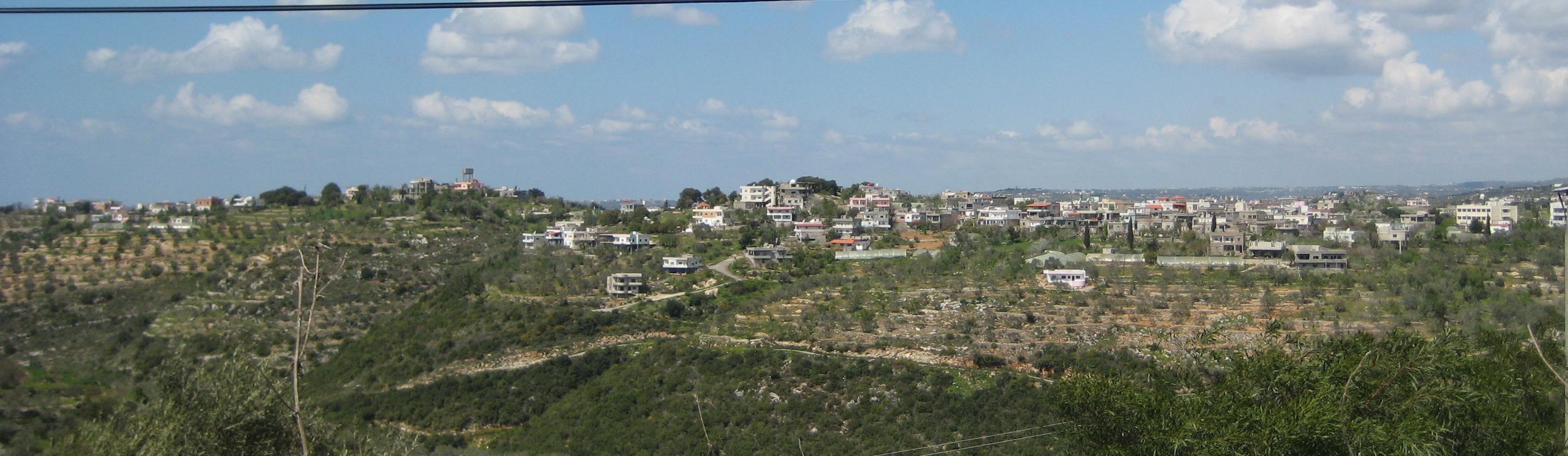
- General View of Al-Annazah

- Location within Syria
- Coordinates: 35°11′46″N 36°3′56″E
- Country: Syria
- Governorate: Tartus
- District: Baniyas
- Subdistrict: Al-Annazah

Population (2004 census)
  - Total: 3,357
- Time zone: UTC+2 (EET)
  - Summer (DST): UTC+3 (EEST)

Al-Annazah (Arabic: العنازة; also spelled al-Annazeh) is a village about 20 km to the northeast of Tartus and 5 km from the Mediterranean Sea. It is less than a one-hour drive to Latakia and about three hours' drive to Damascus. According to the Syria Central Bureau of Statistics, al-Annazah had a population of 3,357 in the 2004 census. Its inhabitants are predominantly members of the Alawite community.

Its hills were covered with olive and oak trees and have many caves. Although there are no rivers in Al-Annaze, it has many valleys. Its inhabitants are all Alawites.

== Natural parks ==
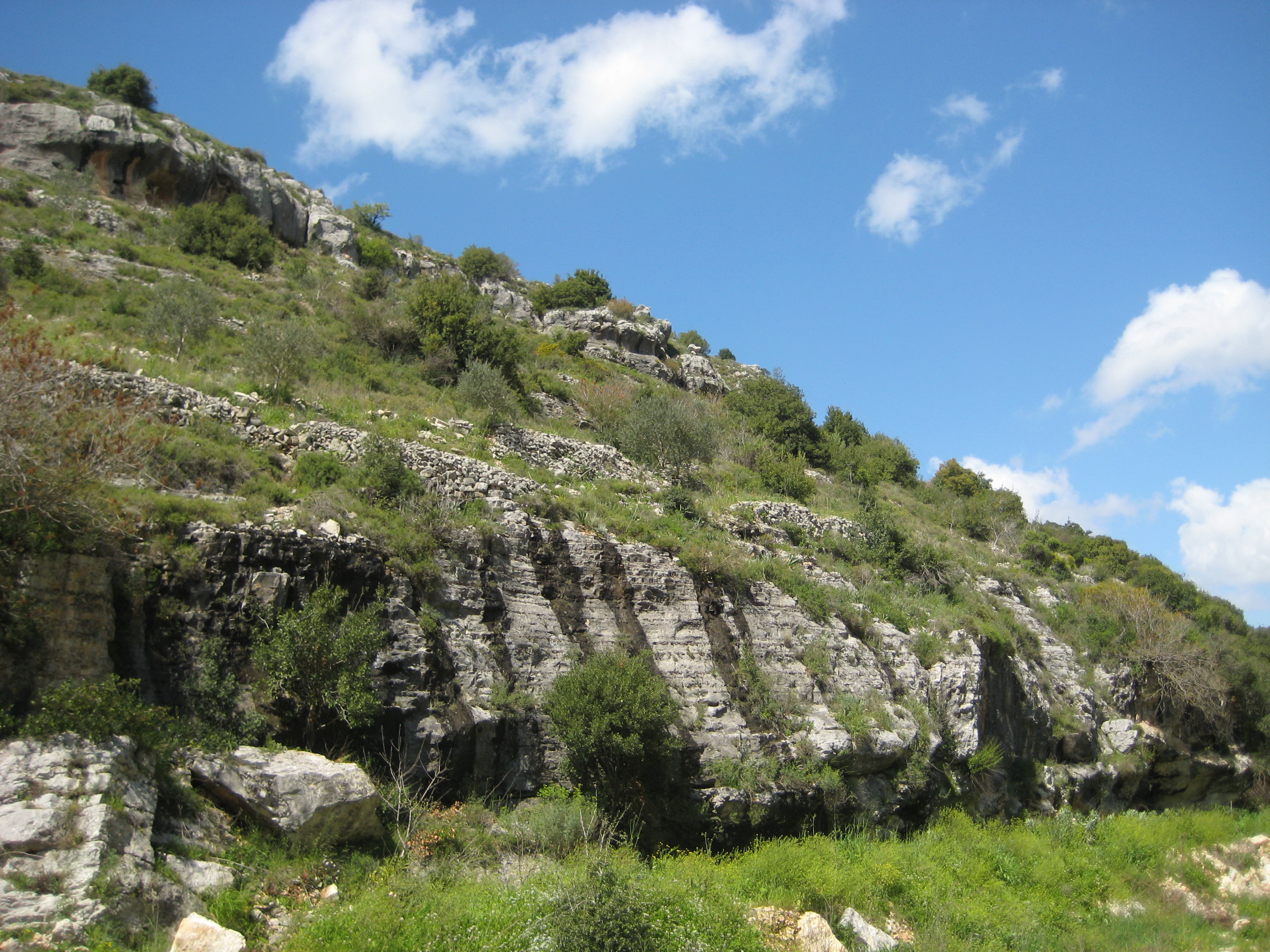
Rocks, olive and oak trees around al-Annazah

Al-Annazah offers the possibility for activities such as rock climbing, valleys walking, hill jogging, bike riding or exploring the jungle. There are caves and jungles in the Ein Ibraheim area, with fresh water, many kinds of birds and wild animals. Another place is Alshikh Abbas forest.

== Public services ==
=== Health centre ===
The Al-Annaze health centre is situated in the centre of the village. It has a team of nurses and doctors who serve Al-Annaze and its neighbour villages. One of the major duties of Al-Annaze medical centre is to offer immunisation services to children. Also first aid service is another major service that can be offered in Al-Annaze's health centre. All the services in Al-Annaze health centre are free. Al-Annaze has a health centre as well as private clinics including specialists for breast care and cardiology, otorhinolaryngology, general surgery, and dentistry, and pharmacies.

=== Public transportations ===
There are many minibuses (capacity 11 to 14 passengers) which run from Al-Annaze to Tartus many times a day. Average time journey is half an hour to Tartus city centre, and it is a ten-minute drive to Tartus-Latakia motorway. The first bus to the city travels at 05:00 early morning and the last one from the city is at 19:00. Two main routes can be used to travel from Al-Annaze to Tartus city centre: the first one is through the Markieh and the other one is through al-Sauda.

=== Telecoms services ===
Syrian telecoms delivers its services to Al-Annaze through Bhanien's electronic telephone switch. The main available service is the fixed telephone service which covers approximately 43% of the people in Al-Annaze. Data services are limited, and the Internet is available for the dial-up internet access plan only with bad quality of service, due to the limitations of the most rural electronic telephone switches in Syria. Mobile services are available on demand from the two main Syrian operators: MTN and Syriatel.

== Education ==
It has a primary school which allows pupils in Al-Annaze to take their elementary and preparatory education starting from age 5/6 until age 14/15. Primary education in Syrian law is mandatory for all pupils from age 5/6 to 14/15 and it is totally free.

Al-Annaze secondary school accepts good students from different villages around Al-Annaze. The school has a lab, library, computer room, activities room and a wide area for volleyball, basketball and football. Students start their education in the secondary school at age 14/15 and they remain for three years to get their high school diploma, which is called Bakaloria. Every year, many graduated students from Al-Annaze secondary school go to the universities to continue their higher studies in different aspects of engineering, medicines, sciences, law, education and literature.

Most students prefer to study in Tishreen University in Latakia as a first priority, because it is close to the village around 70 km and it has a variety of faculties. Some medicine students prefer Damascus due to its good reputation. Although there are students from Al-Annaze in most of the Syrian universities and institutions, Tishreen university is the major destination. Recently, some faculties have been established in Tartous and a few graduated students from Al-Annaze secondary school are doing their studies there.

== Climate ==
Al-Annaze's climate is Mediterranean, it is moderate to hot and wet in summer and it is cosy and wet in winter. Winter is rainy and high humidity. January maximum and minimum temperatures are 15 °C (59 °F) and 6 °C (43 °F). August maximum and minimum temperatures are 30 °C (86 °F) and 19 °C (66 °F). The minimum annual rainfall in Al-Annaze is 85 cm (33.46 in), which occurs from September to May.

Climate data for Al-Annaze
Month	Jan	Feb	Mar	Apr	May	Jun	Jul	Aug	Sep	Oct	Nov	Dec	Year
Mean daily maximum °C (°F)	15 (59)	17 (62.6)	19 (66.2)	20 (68)	24 (75.2)	26 (78.8)	28 (82.4)	30 (86)	23 (73.4)	17 (62.6)	18 (64.4)	13 (55.4)	22.83 (73)
Mean daily minimum °C (°F)	5 (41)	7 (44.6)	10 (50)	12 (53.6)	14 (57.2)	16 (60.8)	18 (64.4)	20 (68)	15 (59)	11 (51.8)	9 (48.2)	6 (42.8)	11.91 (53.41)

== References and Bibliography ==
- Tartus Framing establishment, annual reports for 2007 and 2008.
- Al-Annaze Planting society, latest database is updated on 18 February 2009.
- Tartus tourism establishment.
- Yearly reports (2005, 2006, 2007, 2008) from the Tartus Governorate, local organisations and civil societies.
- Publications from several public and private societies.
