= Al-Shaykh Badr District =

al-Shaykh Badr District منطقة الشيخ بدر
- District
- Map of al-Shaykh Badr District within Tartus Governorate
- Coordinates (al-Shaykh Badr): 34.98°N 36.08°E
- Country: Syria
- Governorate: Tartus
- Seat: al-Shaykh Badr
- Subdistricts: 3 nawāḥī

Area
  - Total: 214.34 km^{2} (82.76 sq mi)

Population (2004)
  - Total: 52,981
  - Density: 247.18/km^{2} (640.20/sq mi)
- Geocode: SY1005

Al-Shaykh Badr District (Arabic: منطقة الشيخ بدر, romanized: manṭiqat Al-Shaykh Badr) is a district of the Tartus Governorate in northwestern Syria. Administrative centre is the town of al-Shaykh Badr. At the 2004 census, the district had a population of 52,981.

== Sub-districts ==
The district of al-Shaykh Badr is divided into three sub-districts or nawāḥī (population as of 2004):

- Al-Shaykh Badr Subdistrict (ناحية الشيخ بدر): population 25,324.
- Brummanet al-Mashayekh Subdistrict (ناحية برمانة المشايخ): population 13,562
- Al-Qamsiyah Subdistrict (ناحية القمصية): population 14,095.
