= Al-Shaykh Badr =

Al-Shaykh Badr الشيخ بدر Sheikh Bader
- Location in Syria
- Coordinates: 34°59′31″N 36°04′48″E
- Country: Syria
- Governorate: Tartus
- District: al-Shaykh Badr
- Subdistrict: Al-Shaykh Badr

Population (2004)
  - Total: 9,486
- Time zone: UTC+2 (EET)
  - Summer (DST): UTC+3 (EEST)

Al-Shaykh Badr (Arabic: الشيخ بدر, romanized: aš-šayḵ badr, also transliterated Sheikh Bader) is a city in western Syria, administratively part of the Tartus Governorate. Al-Shaykh Badr has an altitude of 536 m (1,759 ft). According to the Syria Central Bureau of Statistics (CBS), al-Shaykh Badr, which is the center of its nahiya (subdistrict), had a population of 9,486 in the 2004 census. The town is predominantly populated by Alawites. As of 2008, its subdistrict had a population of 47,982. The town is named after the shrine of a holy man, Shaykh Badr, located within it.

== History ==
=== Ottoman period ===
The modern city of al-Shaykh Badr includes the village of Murayqib, which was recorded as a village throughout the Ottoman period (1517–1918). Tax records from 1519 and 1524 each recorded that the village paid 186 dirhems or piasters, rising to 396 dirhems in 1547 and 1,600 dirhems in 1645. During the ten-year period when Muhammad Ali's Egypt controlled Syria, the governor Ibrahim Pasha dispatched 500 Druze warriors to suppress the Alawite revolt in the mountains in 1834–1835. The Druze were all slain near al-Murayqib at a round mound still referred to as the 'Blood Rock'.

=== French Mandatory period ===
Al-Shaykh Badr was the hometown of Saleh al-Ali, an Alawite tribal sheikh who led the Alawite Revolt of 1919 against occupying French forces, during the period preceding the establishment of the French Mandate of Syria (1920–1946). Al-Shaykh Badr was also home to the Bashaghirah (also Bechargas), a faction of the Matawira tribal confederation originally from the village of Bashraghi, which took a leading role in the revolt. Al-Ali and a dozen other Alawite notables declared the revolt from al-Shaykh Badr in December 1918 and in early 1919 French forces shelled the village with cannon fire. In November 1920, as the revolt had become largely suppressed, French forces entered the village, arresting or executing Alawite notables there.

=== Post-Syrian independence ===
In 1967 al-Shaykh Badr, despite its small size and lack of commercial services (which consisted of a single grocery store) was made the capital of a district (mantiqa), al-Shaykh Badr District. In 1970, al-Shaykh Badr gained city status along with two other Alawite villages, Duraykish and Qardaha, making them the first Alawite settlements to attain such status in Syria. Although its population stood at 437 at the time and it did not serve as a market for the surrounding villages, it was consistently promoted by the state due to the prominence gained by its Bashaghira residents for resisting French rule and the significant number of senior officers from the faction in the Syrian Army. A large statue of Saleh al-Ali was built at the entrance to al-Shaykh Badr and a mausoleum for the prominent rebel, dubbed in official Syrian history as the 'first Syrian revolutionary', was erected on a hill that overlooks the city.

Between 1975 and 1985 the new city prospered due to government investments and the corresponding boom in public employment. In 1984 al-Shaykh Badr's municipal boundaries were extended to incorporate four nearby villages, Risin, Bumanqar, Khirbet Taqala and al-Murayqib, as part of a master plan for a city of 20,000. As of 2000, the city had a population of around 5,000, of which al-Shaykh Badr proper had approximately 2,000 residents. According to the anthropologist Fabrice Balanche, the planned city would unlikely form a contiguous urban center. He described al-Shaykh Badr proper as consisting of a main street with civic buildings separated by shops while the eastern part of the city contained an administrative area, host to schools, a telephone exchange and a post office. Homes were generally scattered, surrounded by gardens and limited to one story. The stagnation of state-sponsored development precipitated the city's economic decline. The opening of commercial shops in all the surrounding villages and the improvement of road connections to the major city of Tartus diminished al-Shaykh Badr's budding role as a market town for its district, with half of its new businesses shuttering since 1985. Small-scale farming also derived little profit for the residents, except to some extent tobacco, silkworm farming and apples.

== Sources ==
- Balanche, Fabrice (2000). Les Alaouites, l'espace et le pouvoir dans la région côtière syrienne : une intégration nationale ambiguë (Thesis) (in French). Tours: Université François Rabelais.
- Douwes, Dick (2010). "Migration, Faith and Community: Extra-Local Linkages in Coastal Syria". In Sluglett, Peter; Weber, Stefan (eds.). Syria and Bilad al-Sham under Ottoman Rule. New York and Leiden: Brill. ISBN 978-90-04-18193-9.
- Moosa, Matti (1987). Extremist Shiites: The Ghulat Sects. Syracuse University Press. ISBN 0-8156-2411-5.
- Winter, Stefan (2016). A History of the 'Alawis: From Medieval Aleppo to the Turkish Republic. Princeton and Oxford: Princeton University Press. ISBN 9780691167787.
