= Baniyas District =

Baniyas District منطقة بانياس
- District
- Map of Baniyas District within Tartus Governorate
- Coordinates (Baniyas): 35°10′56″N 35°56′25″E
- Country: Syria
- Governorate: Tartus
- Seat: Baniyas
- Subdistricts: 7 nawāḥī

Area
  - Total: 581.30 km^{2} (224.44 sq mi)

Population (2004)
  - Total: 174,233
  - Density: 299.73/km^{2} (776.30/sq mi)
- Geocode: SY1002

Baniyas District (Arabic: منطقة بانياس, romanized: manṭiqat Bāniyās) is a district of the Tartus Governorate in northwestern Syria. Administrative centre is the city of Baniyas. At the 2004 census, the district had a population of 174,233. The estimated population of the Alawites of the Baniyas District is approximately 105,000, while the population of Sunni Muslims is estimated at 45,000, in addition to 20,000 Christians, according to the Syrian network for human rights.

== Sub-districts ==
The district of Baniyas is divided into seven sub-districts or nawāḥī (population as of 2004):

- Baniyas Subdistrict (ناحية بانياس): population 94,832.
- Al-Rawda Subdistrict (ناحية الروضة): population 11,688.
- Al-Annazah Subdistrict (ناحية العنازة): population 18,446.
- Al-Qadmus Subdistrict (ناحية القدموس): population 22,370.
- Hammam Wasel Subdistrict (ناحية حمّام واصل): population 8,522.
- Al-Tawahin Subdistrict (ناحية الطواحين): population 10,024.
- Talin Subdistrict (ناحية تالين): population 8,351.
