= Tartus Governorate =

Tartus Governorate مُحافظة طرطوس
- Governorate
- Tartous Governorate
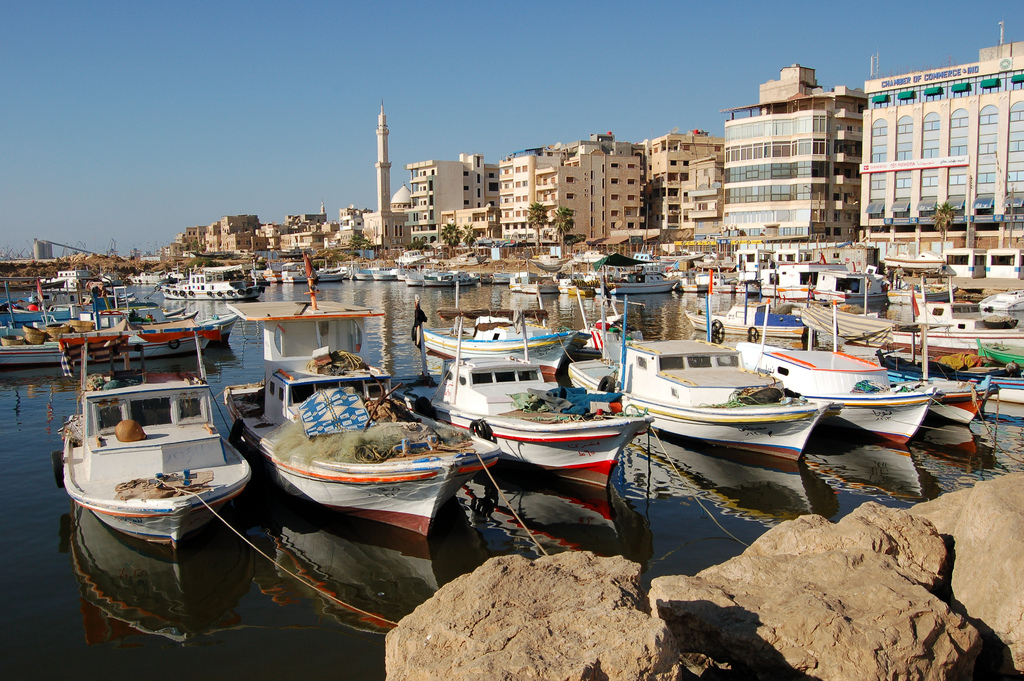
- Boats at the Port of Tartus

- Map of Syria with Tartus highlighted
- Interactive map of Tartus Governorate
- Coordinates (Tartus): 35°N 36°E
- Country: Syria
- Part of Alawite State: 1920–1936
- Separated from Latakia Governorate: 1972
- Capital: Tartus
- Manatiq (Districts): 5

Government
  - Governor: Ahmad al-Shami

Area
  - Total: 1,892 km^{2} (731 sq mi)
- Estimates range between 1,890 km^{2} and 1,892 km^{2}

Population (2011)
  - Total: 797,000
  - Density: 421/km^{2} (1,090/sq mi)
- Time zone: UTC+3 (AST)
- ISO 3166 code: SY-TA
- Main language(s): Arabic

Tartus Governorate (Arabic: مُحافظة طرطوس, romanized: Muḥāfaẓat Ṭarṭūs), officially known as Tartous Governorate, is one of the fourteen governorates of Syria. It is situated in western Syria, bordering Latakia Governorate to the north, Homs and Hama Governorates to the east, Lebanon to the south, and the Mediterranean Sea to the west. It is one of the few governorates in Syria that has an Alawite majority. Sources list the area as 1,890 km^{2} or 1,892 km^{2}, with its capital being Tartus.

== History ==
The present day Tartus Governorate was part of the Alawite State, which existed from 1920 to 1936. In 1972, the Ba'athist administration had established Tartus Governorate, effectively detaching it from Latakia Governorate.

== Archeological sites ==
- Al-Kahf Castle – Isma'ili castle
- Hosn Sulaiman
- Aleika Castle – Isma'ili castle
- Amrit – Phoenician city
- Chastel Rouge (Qal’at Yahmur) – Crusader castle
- Hosn Suleiman
- Margat – Crusader castle
- Citadel of Arwad
- Tell Kazel – Bronze age site (possibly the ancient city of Sumur)
- Carne – Phoenician city
- Chastel Blanc
- Citadel of Tartus
- Burj Al-Sabi

== Geography ==
Tartus comprises roughly half of Syria's Mediterranean coastline; offshore lie five small islands, the largest of which is Arwad. Inland the terrain is mountainous, comprising a section of the Syrian Coastal Mountain Range (Nusayriyah Mountains). The Nahr al-Kabir river forms the border with Lebanon to the south.

=== Settlements ===
Tartus is the regional capital; other major settlements include Al-Hamidiyah, Al Qadmus, Al-Sawda, Ayn ash Shams, Baniyas, Qusaybah and Safita.

=== Districts ===

The governorate is divided into five districts (manatiq). The districts are further divided into 27 sub-districts (nawahi):

- Tartus District (7 sub-districts)
  - Tartus Subdistrict
  - Arwad Subdistrict
  - Al-Hamidiyah Subdistrict
  - Khirbet al-Maazah Subdistrict
  - Al-Sawda Subdistrict
  - Al-Karimah Subdistrict
  - Al-Safsafah Subdistrict
- Baniyas District (7 sub-districts)
  - Baniyas Subdistrict
  - Al-Rawda Subdistrict
  - Al-Annazah Subdistrict
  - Al-Qadmus Subdistrict
  - Hammam Wasel Subdistrict
  - Al-Tawahin Subdistrict
  - Talin Subdistrict
- Duraykish District (4 sub-districts)
  - Duraykish Subdistrict
  - Junaynet Ruslan Subdistrict
  - Hamin Subdistrict
  - Dweir Ruslan Subdistrict
- Safita District (6 sub-districts)
  - Safita Subdistrict
  - Mashta al-Helu Subdistrict
  - Al-Bariqiyah Subdistrict
  - Sebei Subdistrict
  - Al-Sisiniyah Subdistrict
  - Ras al-Khashufah Subdistrict
- Al-Shaykh Badr District (3 sub-districts)
  - Al-Shaykh Badr Subdistrict
  - Brummanet al-Mashayekh Subdistrict
  - Al-Qamsiyah Subdistrict

== Demographics ==
As per the 2004 Syrian census the population was 701,400. A 2011 UNOCHA estimate put the population at 797,000, an estimate preceding the Syrian Civil War which caused a large population decline and socioeconomic devastation.

Religious composition of Tartus Governorate (2011)
Alawites	69%
Sunnis	18%
Ismailis	7%
Christians	6%

The estimated population of 797,000 represented roughly 4% of Syria's population at the time. The population was almost entirely ethnic Arabs; these were Alawites at 69%, 18% Sunni Muslims, 7% Ismaili Muslims, and 6% were Christians (mostly Greek Orthodox). There was a small Cretan Greek community concentrated in Al-Hamidiyah, the descendants of refugees who fled the Greco-Turkish War of 1897.

== Gallery ==
Map of Tartus governorate

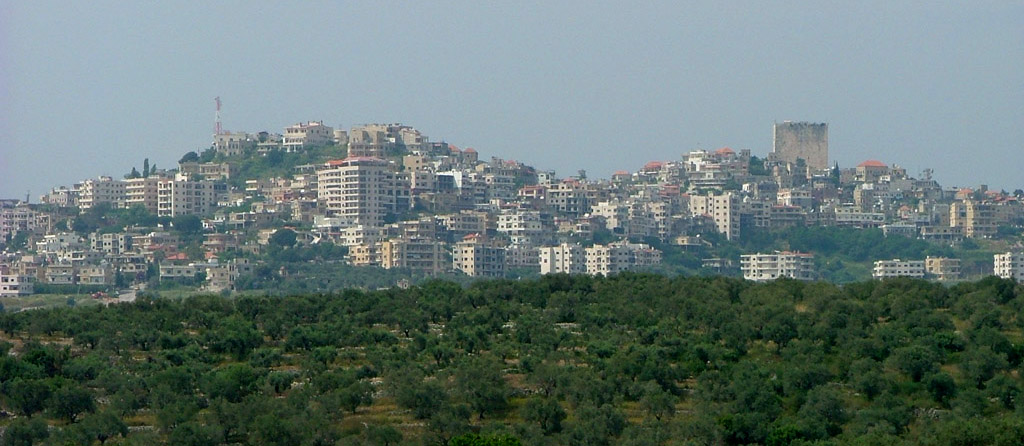
Safita

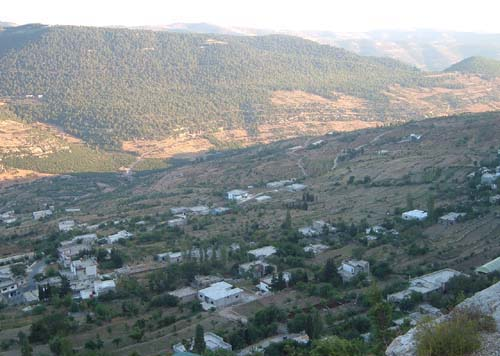
Mountains near Kaff al-Jaa

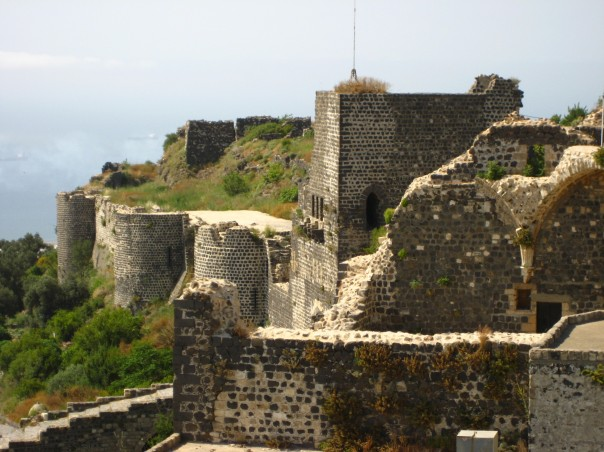
Margat Castle

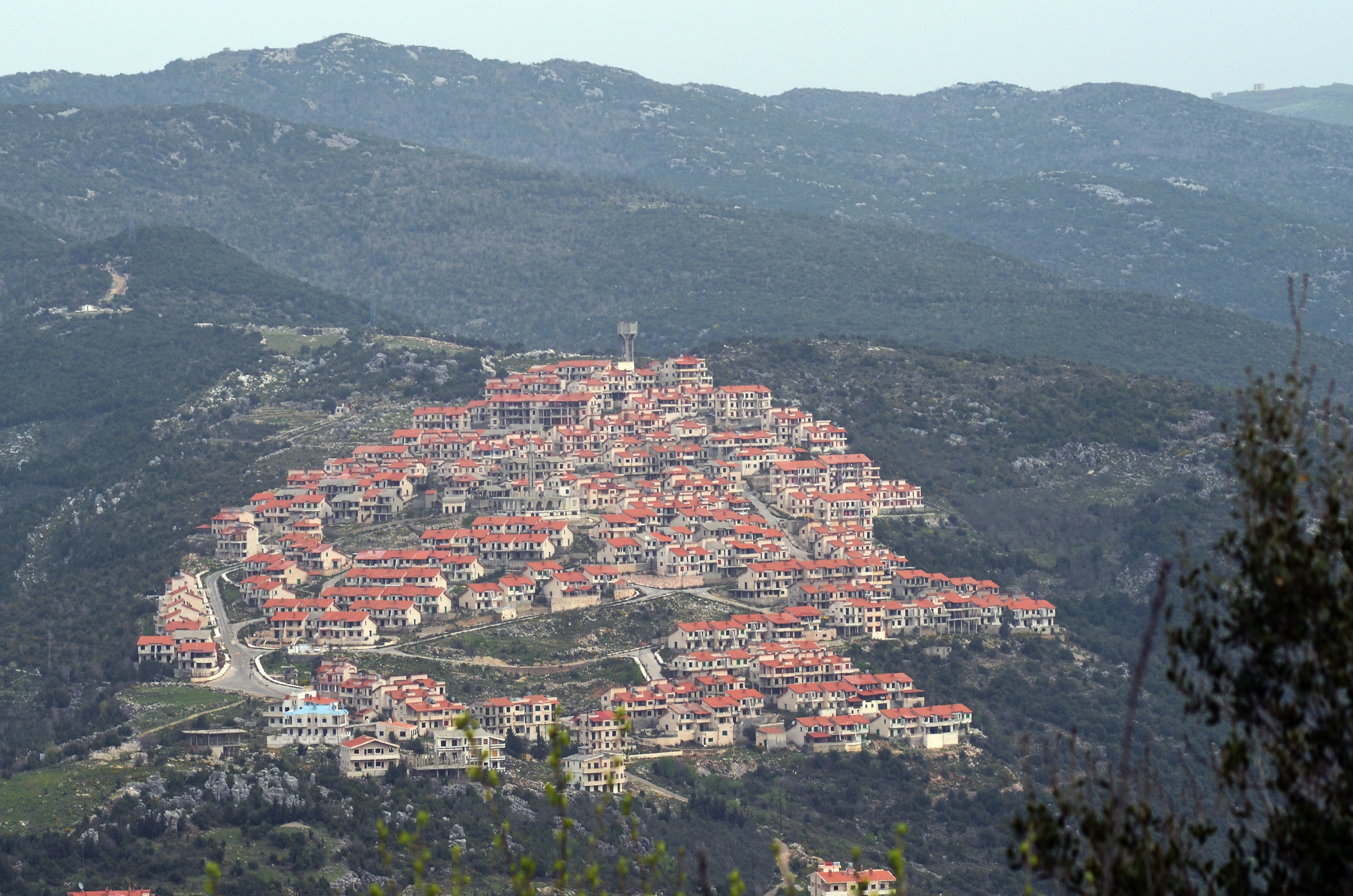
Al Kafrun

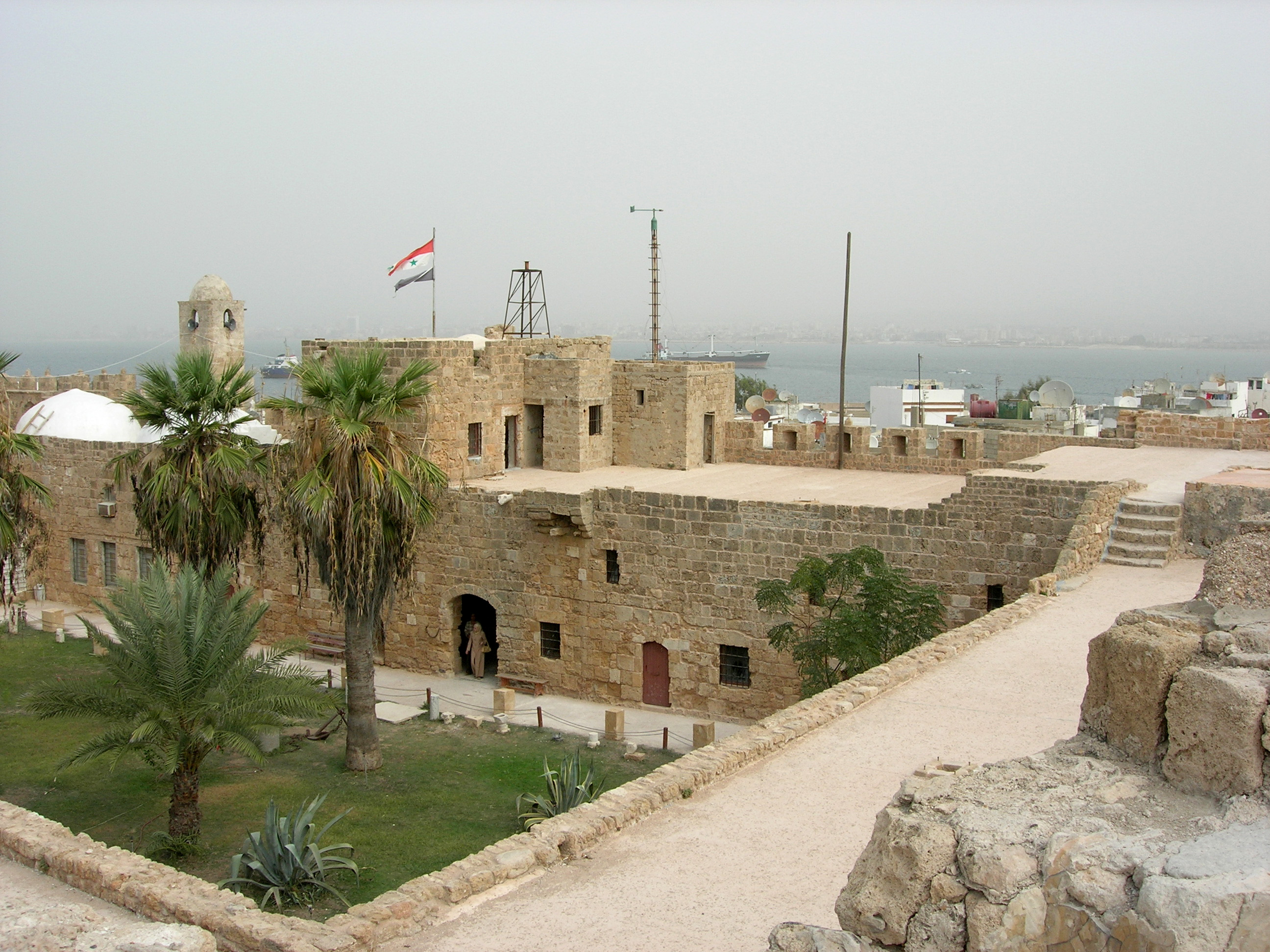
Arwad Castle

== See also ==
- Alawite State
