= Districts of Syria =

Administrative divisions of Syria

The 14 governorates of Syria, or muhafazat (sing. muhafazah), are divided into 65 districts, or manatiq (sing. mintaqah), including the city of Damascus. The districts are further divided into 281 subdistricts, or nawahi (sing. nahiya). Each district bears the same name as its district capital.

Districts and subdistricts are administered by officials appointed by the governor, subject to the approval of the minister of the interior. These officials work with elected district councils to attend to assorted local needs, and serve as intermediaries between central government authority and traditional local leaders, such as village chiefs, clan leaders, and councils of elders.

== Districts of Syria ==
Districts of Syria Quneitra Governorate Daraa Governorate Suwayda Governorate Rif Dimashq Governorate Damascus Governorate Homs Governorate Deir ez-Zor Governorate Al-Hasakah Governorate Aleppo Governorate Hama Governorate Idlib Governorate Latakia Governorate Tartus Governorate Raqqa Governorate

== List of historical districts ==
The 65 districts are listed below by governorate (with capital districts in bold text). The city of Damascus functions as a governorate, a district and a subdistrict. Parts of Quneitra Governorate have been under Israeli occupation since 1967 (see Golan Heights).

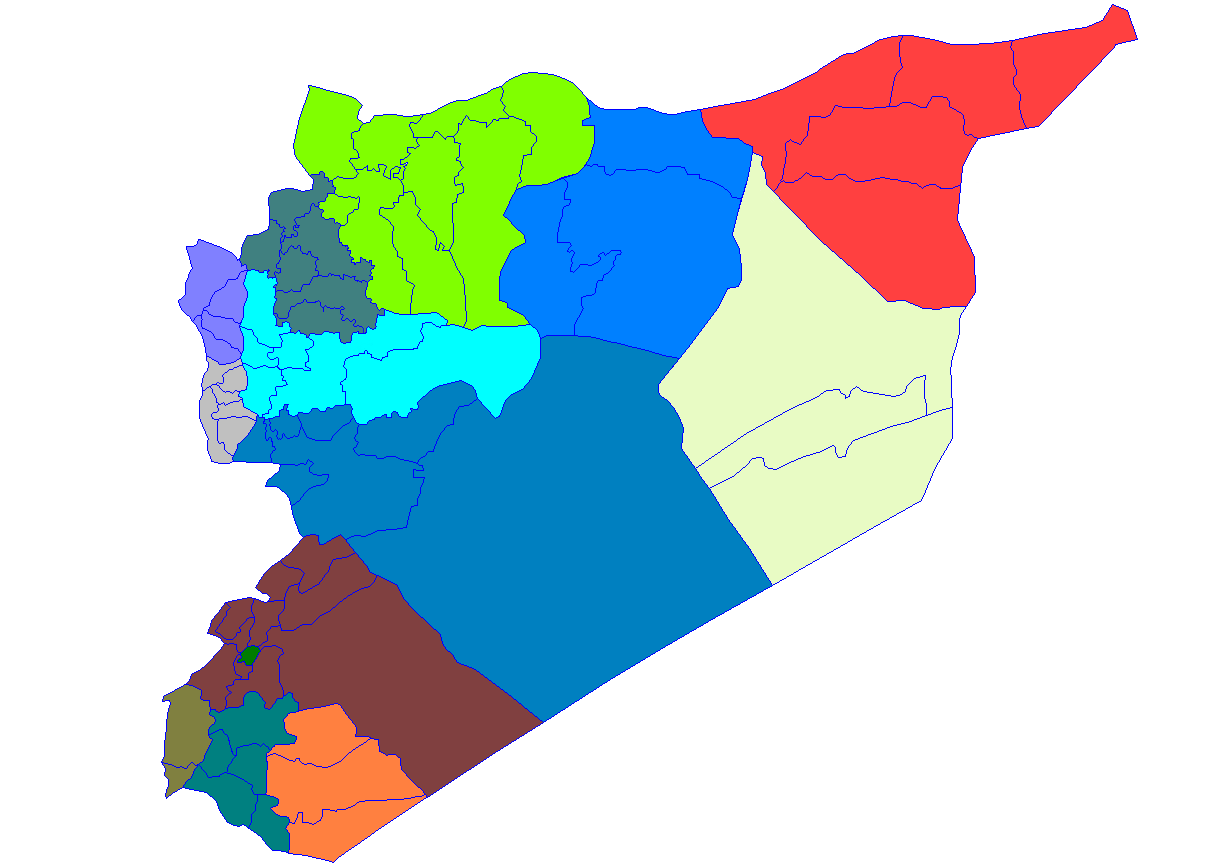
Districts of Syria Aleppo Governorate Damascus Governorate Daraa Governorate Deir ez-Zor Governorate Hama Governorate Al-Hasakah Governorate Homs Governorate Idlib Governorate Latakia Governorate Quneitra Governorate Raqqa Governorate Rif Dimashq Governorate Suwayda Governorate Tartus Governorate

=== Central Syria ===
==== Hama Governorate ====
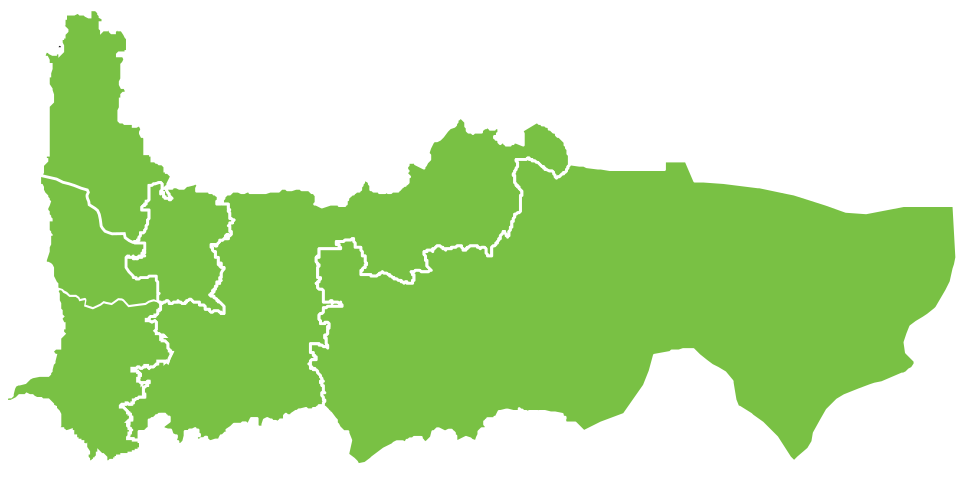
- **Hama District** (4 sub-districts)
- Masyaf District (3 sub-districts)
- Mahardah District (5 sub-districts, a.k.a. Mhardeh, Muhardeh)
- Salamiyah District (5 sub-districts)
- Al-Suqaylabiyah District (5 sub-districts)

==== Homs Governorate ====
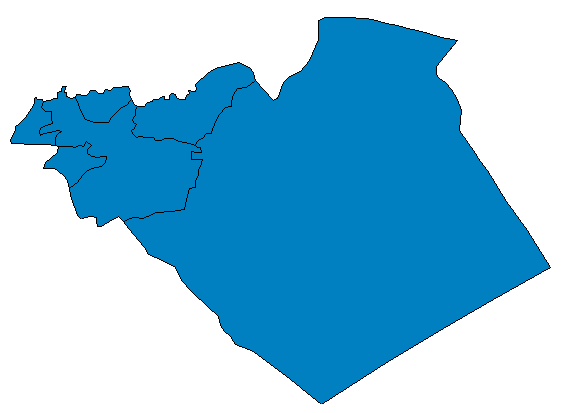
- **Homs District** (10 sub-districts)
- Al-Mukharram District (2 sub-districts)
- Al-Qusayr District (2 sub-districts)
- Ar-Rastan District (2 sub-districts)
- Palmyra District (2 sub-districts)
- Taldou District (3 sub-districts)^{*}
- Talkalakh District (4 sub-districts)

^{*} - a newly created district since 2010, formerly belonging to Homs District

==== Latakia Governorate ====
- **Latakia District** (7 sub-districts)
- Al-Haffah District (5 sub-districts)
- Jableh District (6 sub-districts)
- Qardaha District (4 sub-districts)

==== Tartus Governorate ====
- **Tartus District** (7 sub-districts)
- Baniyas District (7 sub-districts)
- Duraykish District (4 sub-districts)
- Safita District (6 sub-districts)
- Al-Shaykh Badr District (3 sub-districts)

=== North East Syria ===
==== Aleppo Governorate ====
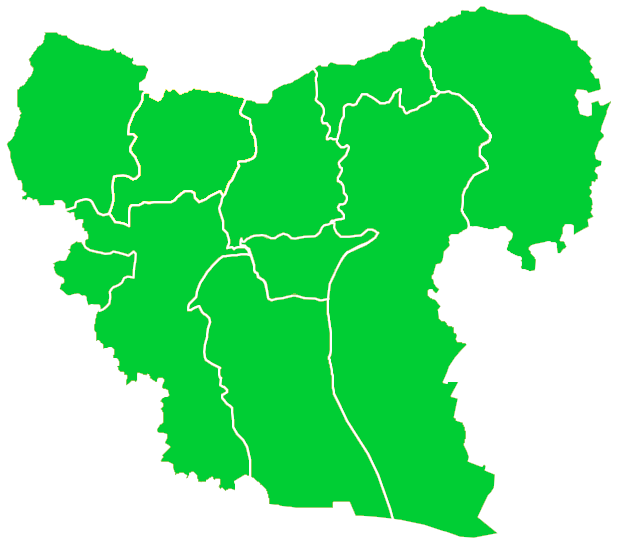
- **Mount Simeon District** (7 sub-districts)^{*}
- Afrin District (7 sub-districts)
- Atarib District (3 sub-districts)^{**}
- Ayn al-Arab District (4 sub-districts)
- Azaz District (6 sub-districts)
- Al-Bab District (4 sub-districts)
- Dayr Hafir District (3 sub-districts)^{***}
- Jarabulus District (2 sub-districts)
- Manbij District (5 sub-districts)
- Safirah District (5 sub-districts)

^{*} - includes Aleppo City
^{**} - a newly created district since 2008, formerly belonging to Mount Simeon District
^{***} - a newly created district since 2009, formerly belonging to Al-Bab District

==== Deir ez-Zor Governorate ====
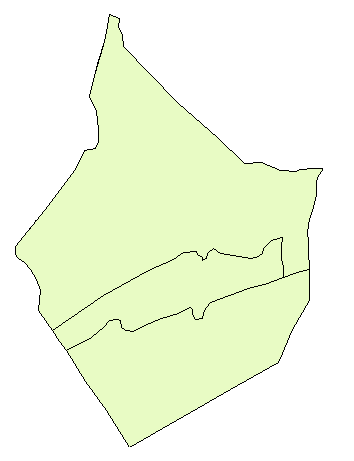
- **Deir ez-Zor District** (7 sub-districts)
- Abu Kamal District (4 sub-districts)
- Mayadin District (3 sub-districts)

==== Al-Hasakah Governorate ====
- **Al-Hasakah District** (4 sub-districts)
- Al-Malikiyah District (3 sub-districts)
- Qamishli District (4 sub-districts)
- Ra's al-'Ayn District (2 sub-districts)
- Al-Shaddadah District (3 sub-districts)

==== Idlib Governorate ====
- **Idlib District** (7 sub-districts)
- Arihah District (3 sub-districts)
- Harem District (6 sub-districts)
- Jisr al-Shughur District (4 sub-districts)
- Ma'arrat al-Numan District (6 sub-districts)

==== Raqqa Governorate ====
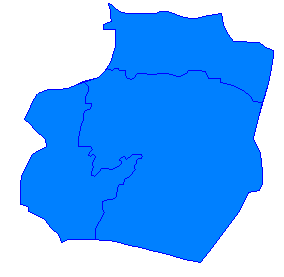
- **Raqqa District** (4 sub-districts)
- Tell Abyad District (3 sub-districts)
- Tabqa District (3 sub-districts)

=== South West Syria ===
==== Damascus Governorate ====
float

- **Damascus** (16 municipalities)

==== Daraa Governorate ====
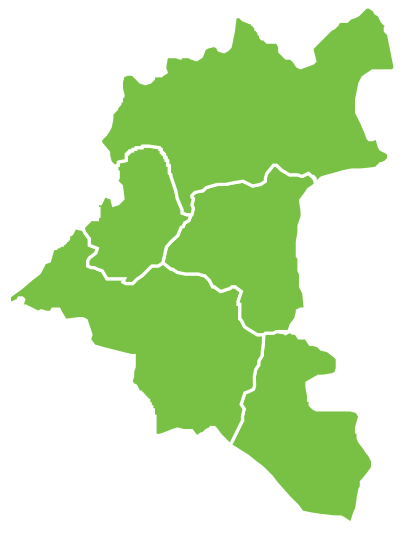
- **Daraa District** (8 sub-districts)
- Izra District (6 sub-districts)
- Al-Sanamayn District (3 sub-districts)

==== Quneitra Governorate ====
- **Quneitra District** (4 sub-districts)
- Fiq District (2 sub-districts)

==== Rif Dimashq Governorate ====
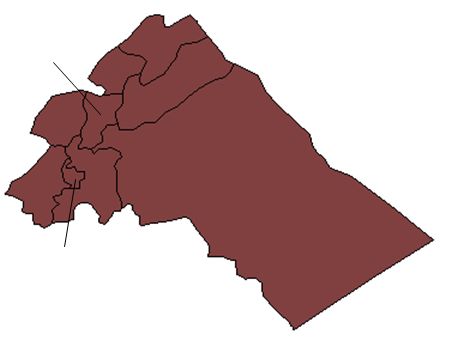
- **Markaz Rif Dimashq District** (6 sub-districts)
- Darayya District (3 sub-districts)
- Douma District (7 sub-districts; a.k.a. Duma)
- An-Nabek District (3 sub-districts; a.k.a. Al-Nabk)
- Qatana District (3 sub-districts)
- Qudsaya District (3 sub-districts)^{*}
- Al-Qutayfah District (4 sub-districts)
- Al-Tall District (3 sub-districts)
- Yabroud District (2 sub-districts; a.k.a. Yabrud)
- Al-Zabadani District (3 sub-districts)

^{*} - a newly created district since 2009, formerly belonging to Markaz Rif Dimashq District and parts of Al-Zabadani District

==== Suwayda Governorate ====
- **Suwayda District** (3 sub-districts)
- Salkhad District (5 sub-districts)
- Shahba District (4 sub-districts)

== Subdistricts of Syria ==
| | Name | District | Governorate |
|---|---|---|---|
| 1 | Hama Subdistrict | Hama District | Hama Governorate |
| 2 | Suran Subdistrict | Hama District | Hama Governorate |
| 3 | Hirbnafsah Subdistrict | Hama District | Hama Governorate |
| 4 | Al-Hamraa Subdistrict | Hama District | Hama Governorate |
| 5 | Masyaf Subdistrict | Masyaf District | Hama Governorate |
| 6 | Jubb Ramlah Subdistrict | Masyaf District | Hama Governorate |
| 7 | Awj Subdistrict | Masyaf District | Hama Governorate |
| 8 | Ayn Halaqim Subdistrict | Masyaf District | Hama Governorate |
| 9 | Wadi al-Uyun Subdistrict | Masyaf District | Hama Governorate |
| 10 | Mahardah Subdistrict | Mharda District | Hama Governorate |
| 11 | Kafr Zita Subdistrict | Mharda District | Hama Governorate |
| 12 | Karnaz Subdistrict | Mharda District | Hama Governorate |
| 13 | Salamiyah Subdistrict | Salamiyah District | Hama Governorate |
| 14 | Barri Sharqi Subdistrict | Salamiyah District | Hama Governorate |
| 15 | Al-Saan Subdistrict | Salamiyah District | Hama Governorate |
| 16 | Sabburah Subdistrict | Salamiyah District | Hama Governorate |
| 17 | Uqayribat Subdistrict | Salamiyah District | Hama Governorate |
| 18 | Al-Suqaylabiyah Subdistrict | Al-Suqaylabiyah District | Hama Governorate |
| 19 | Tell Salhab Subdistrict | Al-Suqaylabiyah District | Hama Governorate |
| 20 | Al-Ziyarah Subdistrict | Al-Suqaylabiyah District | Hama Governorate |
| 21 | Shathah Subdistrict | Al-Suqaylabiyah District | Hama Governorate |
| 22 | Qalaat al-Madiq Subdistrict | Al-Suqaylabiyah District | Hama Governorate |
| 23 | Homs Subdistrict | Homs District | Homs Governorate |
| 24 | Khirbet Tin Nur Subdistrict | Homs District | Homs Governorate |
| 25 | Ayn al-Niser Subdistrict | Homs District | Homs Governorate |
| 26 | Furqlus Subdistrict | Homs District | Homs Governorate |
| 27 | Al-Riqama Subdistrict | Homs District | Homs Governorate |
| 28 | Al-Qaryatayn Subdistrict | Homs District | Homs Governorate |
| 29 | Mahin Subdistrict | Homs District | Homs Governorate |
| 30 | Hisyah Subdistrict | Homs District | Homs Governorate |
| 31 | Sadad Subdistrict | Homs District | Homs Governorate |
| 32 | Shin Subdistrict | Homs District | Homs Governorate |
| 33 | Al-Mukharram Subdistrict | Al-Mukharram District | Homs Governorate |
| 34 | Jubb al-Jarrah Subdistrict | Al-Mukharram District | Homs Governorate |
| 35 | Al-Qusayr Subdistrict | Al-Qusayr District | Homs Governorate |
| 36 | Al-Hoz Subdistrict | Al-Qusayr District | Homs Governorate |
| 37 | Al-Rastan Subdistrict | Al-Rastan District | Homs Governorate |
| 38 | Talbiseh Subdistrict | Al-Rastan District | Homs Governorate |
| 39 | Tadmur Subdistrict | Tadmur District | Homs Governorate |
| 40 | Al-Sukhnah Subdistrct | Tadmur District | Homs Governorate |
| 41 | Taldou Subdistrict | Taldou District | Homs Governorate |
| 42 | Kafr Laha Subdistrict | Taldou District | Homs Governorate |
| 43 | Al-Qabu Subdistrict | Taldou District | Homs Governorate |
| 44 | Talkalakh Subdistrict | Talkalakh District | Homs Governorate |
| 45 | Hadidah Subdistrict | Talkalakh District | Homs Governorate |
| 46 | Al-Nasirah Subdistrict | Talkalakh District | Homs Governorate |
| 47 | Al-Hawash Subdistrict | Talkalakh District | Homs Governorate |
| 48 | Latakia Subdistrict | Latakia District | Latakia Governorate |
| 49 | Al-Bahluliyah Subdistrict | Latakia District | Latakia Governorate |
| 50 | Rabia Subdistrict | Latakia District | Latakia Governorate |
| 51 | Ayn al-Baydah Subdistrict | Latakia District | Latakia Governorate |
| 52 | Qastal Ma'af Subdistrict | Latakia District | Latakia Governorate |
| 53 | Kessab Subdistrict | Latakia District | Latakia Governorate |
| 54 | Hanadi Subdistrict | Latakia District | Latakia Governorate |
| 55 | Al-Haffah Subdistrict | Al-Haffah District | Latakia Governorate |
| 56 | Slinfah Subdistrict | Al-Haffah District | Latakia Governorate |
| 57 | Ayn al-Tineh Subdistrict | Al-Haffah District | Latakia Governorate |
| 58 | Kinsabba Subdistrict | Al-Haffah District | Latakia Governorate |
| 59 | Muzayraa Subdistrict | Al-Haffah District | Latakia Governorate |
| 60 | Jableh Subdistrict | Jableh District | Latakia Governorate |
| 61 | Ayn al-Sharqiyah Subdistrict | Jableh District | Latakia Governorate |
| 62 | Al-Qutailibiyah Subdistrict | Jableh District | Latakia Governorate |
| 63 | Ayn Shiqaq Subdistrict | Jableh District | Latakia Governorate |
| 64 | Daliyah Subdistrict | Jableh District | Latakia Governorate |
| 65 | Beit Yashout Subdistrict | Jableh District | Latakia Governorate |
| 66 | Qardaha Subdistrict | Qardaha District | Latakia Governorate |
| 67 | Harf al-Musaytirah Subdistrict | Qardaha District | Latakia Governorate |
| 68 | Al-Fakhurah Subdistrict | Qardaha District | Latakia Governorate |
| 69 | Jawbat Burghal Subdistrict | Qardaha District | Latakia Governorate |
| 70 | Tartus Subdistrict | Tartus District | Tartus Governorate |
| 71 | Arwad Subdistrict | Tartus District | Tartus Governorate |
| 72 | Al-Hamidiyah Subdistrict | Tartus District | Tartus Governorate |
| 73 | Khirbet al-Maazah Subdistrict | Tartus District | Tartus Governorate |
| 74 | Al-Sawda Subdistrict | Tartus District | Tartus Governorate |
| 75 | Al-Karimah Subdistrict | Tartus District | Tartus Governorate |
| 76 | Al-Safsafah Subdistrict | Tartus District | Tartus Governorate |
| 77 | Baniyas Subdistrict | Baniyas District | Tartus Governorate |
| 78 | Al-Rawda Subdistrict | Baniyas District | Tartus Governorate |
| 79 | Al-Annazah Subdistrict | Baniyas District | Tartus Governorate |
| 80 | Al-Qadmus Subdistrict | Baniyas District | Tartus Governorate |
| 81 | Hammam Wasel Subdistrict | Baniyas District | Tartus Governorate |
| 82 | Al-Tawahin Subdistrict | Baniyas District | Tartus Governorate |
| 83 | Talin Subdistrict | Baniyas District | Tartus Governorate |
| 84 | Duraykish Subdistrict | Duraykish District | Tartus Governorate |
| 85 | Junaynet Ruslan Subdistrict | Duraykish District | Tartus Governorate |
| 86 | Hamin Subdistrict | Duraykish District | Tartus Governorate |
| 87 | Dweir Ruslan Subdistrict | Duraykish District | Tartus Governorate |
| 88 | Safita Subdistrict | Safita District | Tartus Governorate |
| 89 | Mashta al-Helu Subdistrict | Safita District | Tartus Governorate |
| 90 | Al-Bariqiyah Subdistrict | Safita District | Tartus Governorate |
| 91 | Sebei Subdistrict | Safita District | Tartus Governorate |
| 92 | Al-Sisiniyah Subdistrict | Safita District | Tartus Governorate |
| 93 | Ras al-Khashufah Subdistrict | Safita District | Tartus Governorate |
| 94 | Al-Shaykh Badr Subdistrict | Al-Shaykh Badr District | Tartus Governorate |
| 95 | Brummanet al-Mashayekh Subdistrict | Al-Shaykh Badr District | Tartus Governorate |
| 96 | Al-Qamsiyah Subdistrict | Al-Shaykh Badr District | Tartus Governorate |
| 97 | Mount Simeon Subdistrict | Mount Simeon District | Aleppo Governorate |
| 98 | Tell ad-Daman Subdistrict | Mount Simeon District | Aleppo Governorate |
| 99 | Haritan Subdistrict | Mount Simeon District | Aleppo Governorate |
| 100 | Darat Izza Subdistrict | Mount Simeon District | Aleppo Governorate |
| 101 | al-Zirbah Subdistrict | Mount Simeon District | Aleppo Governorate |
| 102 | Zammar Subdistrict | Mount Simeon District | Aleppo Governorate |
| 103 | Hadher Subdistrict | Mount Simeon District | Aleppo Governorate |
| 104 | Afrin Subdistrict | Afrin District | Aleppo Governorate |
| 105 | Bulbul Subdistrict | Afrin District | Aleppo Governorate |
| 106 | Jindires Subdistrict | Afrin District | Aleppo Governorate |
| 107 | Rajo Subdistrict | Afrin District | Aleppo Governorate |
| 108 | Sharran Subdistrict | Afrin District | Aleppo Governorate |
| 109 | Shaykh al-Hadid Subdistrict | Afrin District | Aleppo Governorate |
| 110 | Maabatli Subdistrict | Afrin District | Aleppo Governorate |
| 111 | Atarib Subdistrict | Atarib District | Aleppo Governorate |
| 112 | Ibbin Samaan Subdistrict | Atarib District | Aleppo Governorate |
| 113 | Urum al-Kubrah Subdistrict | Atarib District | Aleppo Governorate |
| 114 | Ayn al-Arab Subdistrict | Ayn al-Arab District | Aleppo Governorate |
| 115 | Shuyukh Tahtani Subdistrict | Ayn al-Arab District | Aleppo Governorate |
| 116 | Sarrin Subdistrict | Ayn al-Arab District | Aleppo Governorate |
| 117 | Al-Jalabiyah Subdistrict | Ayn al-Arab District | Aleppo Governorate |
| 118 | Azaz Subdistrict | Azaz District | Aleppo Governorate |
| 119 | Akhtarin Subdistrict | Azaz District | Aleppo Governorate |
| 120 | Tell Rifaat Subdistrict | Azaz District | Aleppo Governorate |
| 121 | Mare' Subdistrict | Azaz District | Aleppo Governorate |
| 122 | Nubl Subdistrict | Azaz District | Aleppo Governorate |
| 123 | Sawran Subdistrict | Azaz District | Aleppo Governorate |
| 124 | al-Bab Subdistrict | Al-Bab District | Aleppo Governorate |
| 125 | Tadef Subdistrict | Al-Bab District | Aleppo Governorate |
| 126 | al-Rai Subdistrict | Al-Bab District | Aleppo Governorate |
| 127 | Arima Subdistrict | Al-Bab District | Aleppo Governorate |
| 128 | Dayr Hafir Subdistrict | Dayr Hafir District | Aleppo Governorate |
| 129 | Rasm Harmil al-Imam Subdistrict | Dayr Hafir District | Aleppo Governorate |
| 130 | Kuweires Sharqi Subdistrict | Dayr Hafir District | Aleppo Governorate |
| 131 | Jarabulus Subdistrict | Jarabulus District | Aleppo Governorate |
| 132 | Ghandoura Subdistrict | Jarabulus District | Aleppo Governorate |
| 133 | Manbij Subdistrict | Manbij District | Aleppo Governorate |
| 134 | Abu Kahf Subdistrict | Manbij District | Aleppo Governorate |
| 135 | Abu Qilqil Subdistrict | Manbij District | Aleppo Governorate |
| 136 | al-Khafsah Subdistrict | Manbij District | Aleppo Governorate |
| 137 | Maskanah Subdistrict | Manbij District | Aleppo Governorate |
| 138 | as-Safira Subdistrict | As-Safira District | Aleppo Governorate |
| 139 | Tell Aran Subdistrict | As-Safira District | Aleppo Governorate |
| 140 | Khanasir Subdistrict | As-Safira District | Aleppo Governorate |
| 141 | Banan Subdistrict | As-Safira District | Aleppo Governorate |
| 142 | al-Hajib Subdistrict | As-Safira District | Aleppo Governorate |
| 143 | Deir ez-Zor Subdistrict | Deir ez-Zor District | Deir ez-Zor Governorate |
| 144 | Al-Kasrah Subdistrict | Deir ez-Zor District | Deir ez-Zor Governorate |
| 145 | Al-Busayrah Subdistrict | Deir ez-Zor District | Deir ez-Zor Governorate |
| 146 | Al-Muhasan Subdistrict | Deir ez-Zor District | Deir ez-Zor Governorate |
| 147 | Al-Tabni Subdistrict | Deir ez-Zor District | Deir ez-Zor Governorate |
| 148 | Khasham Subdistrict | Deir ez-Zor District | Deir ez-Zor Governorate |
| 149 | Al-Suwar Subdistrict | Deir ez-Zor District | Deir ez-Zor Governorate |
| 150 | Abu Kamal Subdistrict | Abu Kamal District | Deir ez-Zor Governorate |
| 151 | Hajin Subdistrict | Abu Kamal District | Deir ez-Zor Governorate |
| 152 | Al-Jalaa Subdistrict | Abu Kamal District | Deir ez-Zor Governorate |
| 153 | Al-Susah Subdistrict | Abu Kamal District | Deir ez-Zor Governorate |
| 154 | Mayadin Subdistrict | Mayadin District | Deir ez-Zor Governorate |
| 155 | Diban Subdistrict | Mayadin District | Deir ez-Zor Governorate |
| 156 | Al-Asharah Subdistrict | Mayadin District | Deir ez-Zor Governorate |
| 157 | al-Hasakah Subdistrict | Al-Hasakah District | Al-Hasakah Governorate |
| 158 | Tell Tamer Subdistrict | Al-Hasakah District | Al-Hasakah Governorate |
| 159 | al-Shaddadah Subdistrict | Al-Hasakah District | Al-Hasakah Governorate |
| 160 | Markada Subdistrict | Al-Hasakah District | Al-Hasakah Governorate |
| 161 | Bir al-Helou al-Wardiya Subdistrict | Al-Hasakah District | Al-Hasakah Governorate |
| 162 | al-Arishah Subdistrict | Al-Hasakah District | Al-Hasakah Governorate |
| 163 | al-Hawl Subdistrict | Al-Hasakah District | Al-Hasakah Governorate |
| 164 | al-Malikiyah Subdistrict | Al-Malikiyah District | Al-Hasakah Governorate |
| 165 | al-Jawadiyah Subdistrict | Al-Malikiyah District | Al-Hasakah Governorate |
| 166 | al-Yaarubiyah Subdistrict | Al-Malikiyah District | Al-Hasakah Governorate |
| 167 | Qamishli Subdistrict | Qamishli District | Al-Hasakah Governorate |
| 168 | Tell Hamis Subdistrict | Qamishli District | Al-Hasakah Governorate |
| 169 | Amuda Subdistrict | Qamishli District | Al-Hasakah Governorate |
| 170 | al-Qahtaniyah Subdistrict | Qamishli District | Al-Hasakah Governorate |
| 171 | Ras al-Ayn Subdistrict | Ras al-Ayn District | Al-Hasakah Governorate |
| 172 | al-Darbasiyah Subdistrict | Ras al-Ayn District | Al-Hasakah Governorate |
| 173 | Idlib Subdistrict | Idlib District | Idlib Governorate |
| 174 | Abu al-Duhur Subdistrict | Idlib District | Idlib Governorate |
| 175 | Binnish Subdistrict | Idlib District | Idlib Governorate |
| 176 | Saraqib Subdistrict | Idlib District | Idlib Governorate |
| 177 | Taftanaz Subdistrict | Idlib District | Idlib Governorate |
| 178 | Maarrat Misrin Subdistrict | Idlib District | Idlib Governorate |
| 179 | Sarmin Subdistrict | Idlib District | Idlib Governorate |
| 180 | Ariha Subdistrict | Ariha District | Idlib Governorate |
| 181 | Ihsim Subdistrict | Ariha District | Idlib Governorate |
| 182 | Muhambal Subdistrict | Ariha District | Idlib Governorate |
| 183 | Harem Subdistrict | Harem District | Idlib Governorate |
| 184 | Al-Dana Subdistrict | Harem District | Idlib Governorate |
| 185 | Salqin Subdistrict | Harem District | Idlib Governorate |
| 186 | Kafr Takharim Subdistrict | Harem District | Idlib Governorate |
| 187 | Qurqania Subdistrict | Harem District | Idlib Governorate |
| 188 | Armanaz Subdistrict | Harem District | Idlib Governorate |
| 189 | Jisr al-Shughur Subdistric | Jisr al-Shughur District | Idlib Governorate |
| 190 | Bidama Subdistrict | Jisr al-Shughur District | Idlib Governorate |
| 191 | Darkush Subdistrict | Jisr al-Shughur District | Idlib Governorate |
| 192 | Al-Janudiyah Subdistrict | Jisr al-Shughur District | Idlib Governorate |
| 193 | Ma'arrat Nu'man Subdistrict | Ma'arrat Nu'man District | Idlib Governorate |
| 194 | Khan Shaykhun Subdistrict | Ma'arrat Nu'man District | Idlib Governorate |
| 195 | Sinjar Subdistrict | Ma'arrat Nu'man District | Idlib Governorate |
| 196 | Kafr Nabl Subdistrict | Ma'arrat Nu'man District | Idlib Governorate |
| 197 | Al-Tamanah Subdistrict | Ma'arrat Nu'man District | Idlib Governorate |
| 198 | Hish Subdistrict | Ma'arrat Nu'man District | Idlib Governorate |
| 199 | Raqqa Subdistrict | Raqqa District | Raqqa Governorate |
| 200 | Al-Sabkhah Subdistrict | Raqqa District | Raqqa Governorate |
| 201 | Al-Karamah Subdistrict | Raqqa District | Raqqa Governorate |
| 202 | Maadan Subdistrict | Raqqa District | Raqqa Governorate |
| 203 | Tell Abyad Subdistrict | Tell Abyad District | Raqqa Governorate |
| 204 | Suluk Subdistrict | Tell Abyad District | Raqqa Governorate |
| 205 | Ayn Issa Subdistrict | Tell Abyad District | Raqqa Governorate |
| 206 | Al-Tabqah Subdistrict | Al-Tabqah District | Raqqa Governorate |
| 207 | Al-Mansurah Subdistrict | Al-Tabqah District | Raqqa Governorate |
| 208 | Al-Jarniyah Subdistrict | Al-Tabqah District | Raqqa Governorate |
| 209 | Damascus | Damascus District | Damascus Governorate |
| 210 | Daara Subdistrict | Daraa District | Daraa Governorate |
| 211 | Bosra Subdistrict | Daraa District | Daraa Governorate |
| 212 | Khirbet Ghazaleh Subdistrict | Daraa District | Daraa Governorate |
| 213 | Al-Shajara Subdistrict | Daraa District | Daraa Governorate |
| 214 | Da'el Subdistrict | Daraa District | Daraa Governorate |
| 215 | Muzayrib Subdistrict | Daraa District | Daraa Governorate |
| 216 | Al-Jiza Subdistrict | Daraa District | Daraa Governorate |
| 217 | Al-Musayfirah Subdistrict | Daraa District | Daraa Governorate |
| 218 | Izra Subdistrict | Izra District | Daraa Governorate |
| 219 | Jasim Subdistrict | Izra District | Daraa Governorate |
| 220 | Al-Hirak Subdistrict | Izra District | Daraa Governorate |
| 221 | Nawa Subdistrict | Izra District | Daraa Governorate |
| 222 | Al-Shaykh Subdistrict | Izra District | Daraa Governorate |
| 223 | Tasil Subdistrict | Izra District | Daraa Governorate |
| 224 | Al-Sanamayn Subdistrict | Al-Sanamayn District | Daraa Governorate |
| 225 | Al-Masmiyah Subdistrict | Al-Sanamayn District | Daraa Governorate |
| 226 | Ghabaghib Subdistrict | Al-Sanamayn District | Daraa Governorate |
| 227 | Quneitra Subdistrict | Quneitra District | Quneitra Governorate |
| 228 | Jabta Elhashab Subdistrict | Quneitra District | Quneitra Governorate |
| 229 | Khishniyah Subdistrict | Quneitra District | Quneitra Governorate |
| 230 | Mas'ade Subdistrict | Quneitra District | Quneitra Governorate |
| 231 | Fiq Subdistrict | Fiq District | Quneitra Governorate |
| 232 | Al-Butayhah Subdistrict | Fiq District | Quneitra Governorate |
| 233 | al-Kiswah Subdistrict | Markaz Rif Dimashq District | Rif Dimashq Governorate |
| 234 | Babbila Subdistrict | Markaz Rif Dimashq District | Rif Dimashq Governorate |
| 235 | Jaramana Subdistrict | Markaz Rif Dimashq District | Rif Dimashq Governorate |
| 236 | al-Malihah Subdistrict | Markaz Rif Dimashq District | Rif Dimashq Governorate |
| 237 | Kafr Batna Subdistrict | Markaz Rif Dimashq District | Rif Dimashq Governorate |
| 238 | Arbin Subdistrict | Markaz Rif Dimashq District | Rif Dimashq Governorate |
| 239 | Darayya Subdistrict | Darayya District | Rif Dimashq Governorate |
| 240 | Sahnaya Subdistrict | Darayya District | Rif Dimashq Governorate |
| 241 | al-Hajar al-Aswad Subdistrict | Darayya District | Rif Dimashq Governorate |
| 242 | Douma Subdistrict | Douma District | Rif Dimashq Governorate |
| 243 | Harasta Subdistrict | Douma District | Rif Dimashq Governorate |
| 244 | Al-Sabe' Biyar Subdistrict | Douma District | Rif Dimashq Governorate |
| 245 | Al-Dumayr Subdistrict | Douma District | Rif Dimashq Governorate |
| 246 | Al-Nashabiyah Subdistrict | Douma District | Rif Dimashq Governorate |
| 247 | Al-Ghizlaniyah Subdistrict | Douma District | Rif Dimashq Governorate |
| 248 | Harran al-Awamid Subdistrict | Douma District | Rif Dimashq Governorate |
| 249 | an-Nabek Subdistrict | An-Nabek District | Rif Dimashq Governorate |
| 250 | Deir Atiyah Subdistrict | An-Nabek District | Rif Dimashq Governorate |
| 251 | Qara Subdistrict | An-Nabek District | Rif Dimashq Governorate |
| 252 | Qatana Subdistrict | Qatana District | Rif Dimashq Governorate |
| 253 | Beit Jen Subdistrict | Qatana District | Rif Dimashq Governorate |
| 254 | Sa'sa' Subdistrict | Qatana District | Rif Dimashq Governorate |
| 255 | Qudsaya Subdistrict | Qudsaya District | Rif Dimashq Governorate |
| 256 | Al-Dimas Subdistrict | Qudsaya District | Rif Dimashq Governorate |
| 257 | Ain al-Fijah Subdistrict | Qudsaya District | Rif Dimashq Governorate |
| 258 | al-Qutayfah Subdistrict | Al-Qutayfah District | Rif Dimashq Governorate |
| 259 | Jayroud Subdistrict | Al-Qutayfah District | Rif Dimashq Governorate |
| 260 | Maaloula Subdistrict | Al-Qutayfah District | Rif Dimashq Governorate |
| 261 | ar-Ruhaybah Subdistrict | Al-Qutayfah District | Rif Dimashq Governorate |
| 262 | al-Tall Subdistrict | Al-Tall District | Rif Dimashq Governorate |
| 263 | Saidnaya Subdistrict | Al-Tall District | Rif Dimashq Governorate |
| 264 | Rankous Subdistrict | Al-Tall District | Rif Dimashq Governorate |
| 265 | Yabroud Subdistrict | Yabroud District | Rif Dimashq Governorate |
| 266 | Assal al-Ward Subdistrict | Yabroud District | Rif Dimashq Governorate |
| 267 | al-Zabadani Subdistrict | Al-Zabadani District | Rif Dimashq Governorate |
| 268 | Madaya Subdistrict | Al-Zabadani District | Rif Dimashq Governorate |
| 269 | Serghaya Subdistrict | Al-Zabadani District | Rif Dimashq Governorate |
| 270 | as-Suwayda Subdistrict | Suwayda District | Suwayda Governorate |
| 271 | al-Mazraa Subdistrict | Suwayda District | Suwayda Governorate |
| 272 | al-Mushannaf Subdistrict | Suwayda District | Suwayda Governorate |
| 273 | Salkhad Subdistrict | Salkhad District | Suwayda Governorate |
| 274 | al-Qurayya Subdistrict | Salkhad District | Suwayda Governorate |
| 275 | al-Ghariyah Subdistrict | Salkhad District | Suwayda Governorate |
| 276 | Dhibin Subdistrict | Salkhad District | Suwayda Governorate |
| 277 | Malah Subdistrict | Salkhad District | Suwayda Governorate |
| 278 | Shahba Subdistrict | Shahba District | Suwayda Governorate |
| 279 | Shaqqa Subdistrict | Shahba District | Suwayda Governorate |
| 280 | al-Ariqah Subdistrict | Shahba District | Suwayda Governorate |
| 281 | as-Sawra as-Saghira Subdistrict | Shahba District | Suwayda Governorate |

== See also ==
- List of cities in Syria
- List of towns and villages in Syria
- Cities and towns during the Syrian Civil War
