= Duraykish and al-Shaykh Badr (People's Assembly electoral district) =

Electoral district of Syria's national legislature

- Electoral district for the People's Assembly
- Location of Duraykish and al-Shaykh Badr within Syria
- District: Duraykish; Al-Shaykh Badr
- Governorate: Tartus
- Population: 113,959 (2004)
- Electorate: 50
- Area: 399.21 km^{2}

Current Electoral district
- Created: 2025
- Seats: 1 (2025–present)
- MPA: ▌Lina Aizouqi (Ind.)
- Created from: Tartus

Duraykish and al-Shaykh Badr (Arabic: دريكيش والشيخ بدر) is one of the 60 electoral districts of the People's Assembly, the national legislature of Syria. It is conterminous with the districts of Duraykish and al-Shaykh Badr. The electoral district currently elects one of the 140 elected members of the People's Assembly.

== Electoral system ==
The 2025 elections were held under a provisional electoral system, enacted by Presidential Decree 142 on 20 August 2025. The new framework replaces direct elections, with an indirect system. Instead of direct votes, subcommittees will choose delegates that form one electoral college per electoral district, which in turn will choose MPs. The number of members on each governorate's sub-committee matches the number of MPs the governorate will elect.

== Members of the People's Assembly ==
| Elections | MPA (Party) |
|---|---|
| 2025 | Lina Aizouqi (Independent) |
