= Reactions to the fall of the Assad regime =

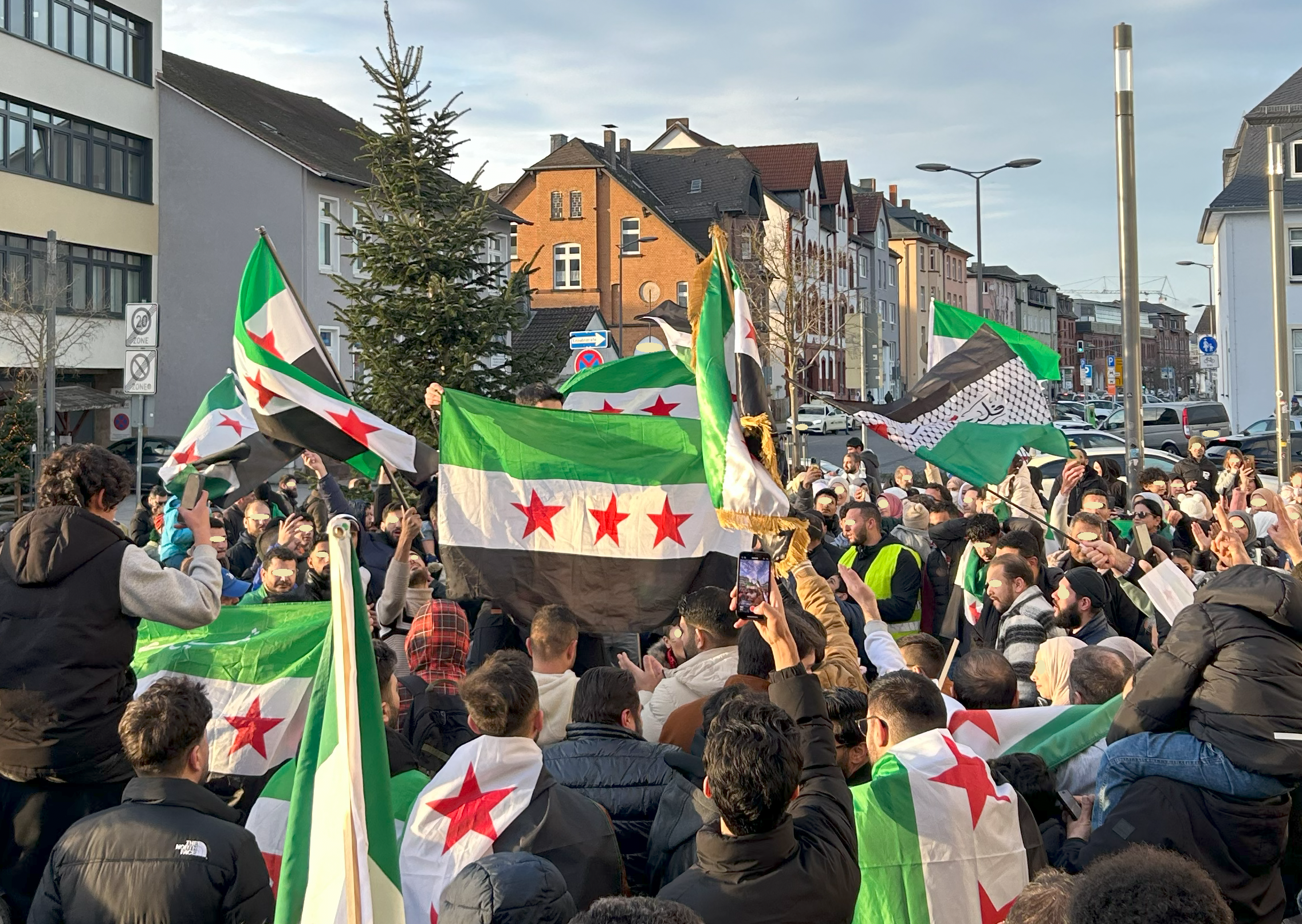
Syrians in Germany celebrating the fall of the regime

Following the collapse of the Assad regime in Syria on 8 December 2024 during major opposition offensives led by Hay'at Tahrir al-Sham (HTS), many states and international organizations offered varied reactions. Several Western governments released statements welcoming the change in government, with some moving to suspend asylum applications for Syrian refugees. Members of the Syrian public and diaspora held demonstrations celebrating the fall of the regime.

== National governments and institutions ==
=== Syria ===
==== Regime officials ====
Prime Minister Mohammad Ghazi al-Jalali expressed his commitment to uphold a stable government and readiness to collaborate with the leadership selected by the Syrian people. Former foreign minister Bassam al-Sabbagh said he was "surprised" to receive news of the siege in Damascus, saying it was a "historic and watershed event for all Syrians". The Ministry of Foreign Affairs and Expatriates said that its diplomatic representatives would continue to operate and serve its citizens overseas.

Ibrahim al-Hadid, who succeeded Bashar al-Assad as General Secretary of the Ba'ath Party, said that the party would support a transitional government to maintain Syrian unity.

Several high-ranking officials from Assad's regime and their families allegedly sought refuge in Hezbollah-controlled southern Beirut. Several of them, including Ali Mamlouk, Ghada Adib Mhanna and Firas Issa Shaleesh, were staying at luxury hotels and guarded by security officers. According to Beirut-based news outlet Nidaa al-Watan, their escape was planned several days before the fall of Damascus and facilitated by Hezbollah. A Lebanese border general security officer may have also been bribed several hundred thousand dollars to allow them into Lebanon.

==== Syrian opposition ====
HTS declared Syria "liberated". The group issued proclamations via social media platforms announcing the conclusion of what they termed a "dark era" and promised a "new Syria" where "everyone lives in peace and justice prevails". Their statements specifically addressed displaced persons and former political prisoners, extending invitations for their return.

The president of the National Coalition of Syrian Revolutionary and Opposition Forces, Hadi al-Bahra, announced the new government in December.

The National Coordination Committee for Democratic Change welcomed "what the Syrian people achieved on December 8, 2024" and declared that their aim is to "build a transitional phase to move from tyranny to democracy" to prevent "a new form of tyrannical rule".

Fighters of the Turkish-backed Syrian National Army (SNA) in northern Syria continued their offensive against U.S.-backed Syrian Democratic Forces forces. On 9 December, SNA fighters captured the city of Manbij.

==== Other ====
The Syrian Social Nationalist Party described it to be "necessary to work to find an acceptable and appropriate solution" to create "an authority emanating from the will of the Syrians" and has preservation the unity, society, interests, institutions the consolidation of the national state and Palestine as its "compass".

The People's Will Party "congratulate[d] the Syrian people on overcoming a black page in their history" called for a "smooth and peaceful transfer of power".

=== International ===
Leaders and officials of the United States and Israel said they would not be involved with the situation in Syria.

==== G20 member states ====
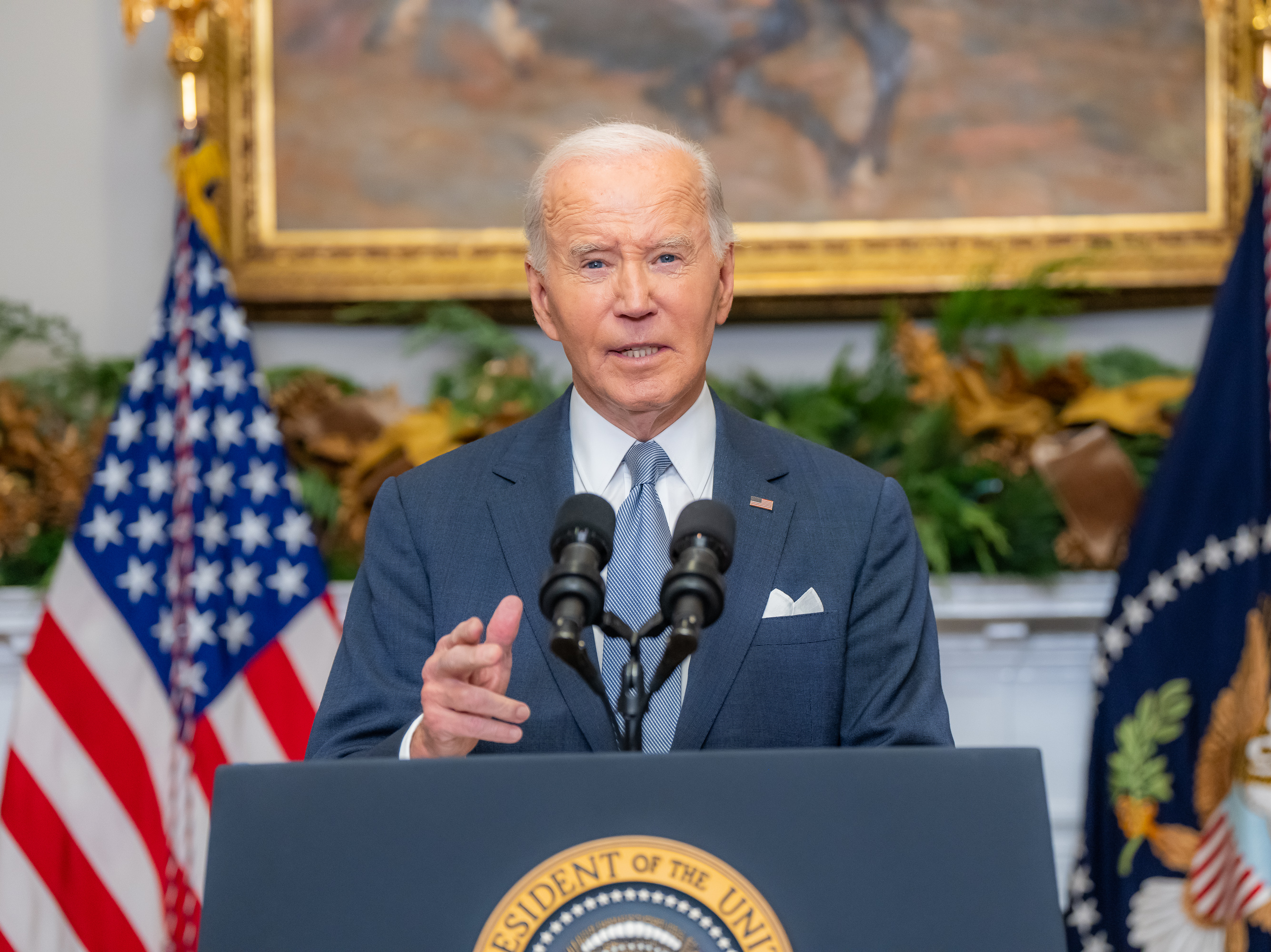
U.S. President Joe Biden during his speech reflecting on the fall of the Assad regime on 8 December

- Argentina: The Ministry of Foreign Affairs, International Trade and Worship advised its citizens to flee the country as soon as possible. Accordingly, it warned those staying to monitor the situation.
- Brazil: The Ministry of Foreign Affairs announced its commitment to a negotiated political solution to the crisis whilst maintaining Syria's territorial unity and sovereignty. Moreover, it pledged to support UN Security Council resolutions.
- Canada: Prime Minister Justin Trudeau urged all parties involved to respect human rights and hailed the end of the government, stating that the "fall of Assad's dictatorship ends decades of brutal oppression", adding that "A new chapter for Syria can begin here — one free of terrorism and suffering for the Syrian people".
- China: A foreign ministry spokesperson said on 8 December that the Chinese government "is closely following the situation in Syria and hopes that stability will return as soon as possible" and "We urge relevant parties in Syria to ensure the safety and security of the Chinese institutions and personnel in Syria."
- France: President Emmanuel Macron announced that "the barbaric state has fallen," and expressed France's commitment "to the security of all in the Middle East."
- Germany: Chancellor Olaf Scholz described the situation as "good news". Foreign minister Annalena Baerbock said that Assad "must finally be held accountable" for his atrocities against the Syrian people.
- India: The Indian external affairs ministry called for a peace process and the preservation of Syria's unity, sovereignty and territorial integrity. The ministry also said 90 Indian citizens were in Syria at the time which they were in contact with due to safety and security risks. By 13 December, the ministry evacuated 77 citizens who wanted to return while its embassy remained operational.
- Indonesia: Deputy Foreign Minister Anis Matta called on the appropriate parties to protect the safety and security of the Syrian people and guarantees that Indonesia will continue to keep a careful eye on the situation in Syria. He underlined that Indonesia believes Syrians "can start a new and better life" and respects Syria's territorial integrity.
- Japan: Foreign Minister Takeshi Iwaya stated that given the unpredictable Middle East scenario, Japan is closely monitoring the events in Syria with great concern and hopes that the violence would end quickly and that everyone in the country will be able to enjoy their basic human rights, freedom, dignity, and prosperity. He continued reiterating that Japan strongly asks all parties to cease hostilities as soon as possible, abide by international law, especially international humanitarian law, and take the required actions to ease tensions in the region.
- Mexico: The Secretariat of Foreign Affairs urged Mexicans in the area to defer to the Mexican embassy in Lebanon.
- Russia: The Foreign Ministry confirmed that Assad resigned from the presidency and departed Syria for Russia after holding talks with the parties involved in the conflict, adding that "Russia did not take part in these talks." Sergey Lavrov, Russia's foreign minister, said he and the ministers of Turkey and Iran requested an "immediate end to hostile activities".
- Saudi Arabia: The Ministry of Foreign Affairs expressed its "satisfaction with the positive steps" in Syria. Saudi Arabia called for "concerted efforts to preserve the unity of Syria and the cohesion of its people."
- South Africa: On 5 December the Department of International Relations stated that the country stood "in solidarity with the Government and people of the Syrian Arab Republic... [and] express[es] our grave concern at the offensive attack in Aleppo and Idlib by Tahrir Al-Sham (HTS), which has been designated as a terrorist organisation by the UN Security Council, and a coalition of foreign mercenaries."
- Turkey: President Recep Tayyip Erdoğan expressed hope for peace and stability in Syria after thirteen years of conflict and said his administration would intervene any attempts to disrupt Syrian territorial sovereignty, saying that "we cannot allow Syria to be divided again". Foreign minister Hakan Fidan said that "Syria has reached a stage where the Syrian people will shape the future of their own country." Fidan stated at a press conference in Doha that "there was no contact with Assad in his final days," emphasizing that Erdoğan "reached out to the regime to achieve national unity and peace, but Assad rejected it." Fidan also cautioned Kurdish groups against "taking advantage of the situation" as part of Turkey's attempt to prevent Kurdish control of the country, and in the aftermath pleaded for the international community to "unite and reconstruct" the country.
- United Kingdom: Prime Minister Keir Starmer said he welcomes the fall of "Assad's barbaric regime" and called for "peace and stability" in Syria. British foreign secretary David Lammy described Bashar as "the rat of Damascus, fleeing to Moscow with his tail between his legs."
- United States: President Joe Biden stated in a speech that "for the first time ever neither Russia nor Iran nor Hezbollah could defend this abhorrent regime in Syria," and claimed credit for Assad's overthrow, stating it was largely due to a combination of international sanctions, American military presence in Syria, and support for Israeli military operations against Iran-backed groups in the region. He further said that "some of the rebel groups that took down Assad have their own grim record of terrorism and human right abuses" and his administration will be monitoring them. Biden held a meeting with members of his national security team to address the situation.
  - President-elect Donald Trump said that "Assad is gone. He fled his country" due to the fact that Assad's "protector," Russia, lost interest in Syria due to its war with Ukraine. He also referred to it as an "unfriendly takeover" by Turkey and called for non-interference in the conflict as it is "not our fight," declaring Syria to be "not our friend."
  - Secretary of State Antony Blinken called the diplomats of Jordan, Qatar and the United Arab Emirates, saying that Syrian territory should not be used to facilitate terrorist organisations. He also highlighted the need for chemical weapons to be seized and disposed, protection of minority groups, and protection of women's rights. On 10 December, Blinken said the United States would "recognize and fully support" the new Syrian government if the transition process were "credible, inclusive and nonsectarian" and met global guidelines.
  - Deputy Assistant Secretary of Defense for the Middle East, Daniel B. Shapiro, said United States forces would remain in eastern Syria to prevent renewed Islamic State activities. He also pleaded for "all parties" to safeguard civilians and adhere to international norms, and added that "no one should shed any tears over the end of the Assad regime".

==== Arab world ====
- Algeria: The Ministry of Foreign Affairs urged "unity and peace among all Syrian parties to preserve the country's security and stability and the unity and integrity of its territory," and called for dialogue between all parties involved.
- Bahrain: The Ministry of Foreign Affairs confirmed that Bahrain is keeping a close eye on Syria's developments, in keeping with its concerns about security and stability, as well as its desire to protect civilians in compliance with international humanitarian law and maintain Syria's sovereignty, unity, and territorial integrity. It reaffirmed Bahrain's backing for regional and global initiatives to support the Syrian people and their hopes for a prosperous future marked by justice, security, stability, and togetherness.
- Egypt: The Ministry of Foreign Affairs expressed Egypt's support for Syria's "sovereignty, unity, and territorial integrity," calling on all parties in the conflict to initiate a "comprehensive political process" to establish peace. Some Egyptians were less enthusiastic due to an uncertain future with the new government. Egyptian pro-government media also received Assad's loss negatively with political commentators describing it an "ill omen for Arab security."
- Iraq: The government issued an official statement stressing the need to respect the free will of all Syrians, and the importance of Syria's security, territorial integrity, and maintaining its independence.
- Jordan: King Abdullah II stated that Jordan stands with the Syrian people and respects their will and choices.
- Kuwait: In a statement, the Ministry of Foreign Affairs said it is "monitoring, with great interest, the current developments in the sisterly state of Syria, stressing the necessity of maintaining the country's unity." The ministry reaffirmed in a statement released on Sunday the necessity of protecting Syrians and putting an end to violence while also respecting Syria's independence and sovereignty over its regions. The ministry also reaffirmed Kuwait's commitment to helping Syria maintain its national institutions and dialogue in order to achieve stability.
- Lebanon: The Lebanese army said it was reinforcing its presence on its northern and eastern borders with Syria "in light of rapid developments."
- Morocco: Foreign minister Nasser Bourita expressed his support for "any political solution that would guarantee the rights of the Syrian people while preserving their sovereignty over their entire territory".
- Oman: In a statement issued by the Foreign Ministry, Oman stresses the need to respect the will of the brotherly Syrian people and fully preserve Syria’s sovereignty, territorial integrity and unity. Oman calls on all parties to exercise self restraint, to avoid escalation and violence, and to move towards achieving national reconciliation, in a way that meets the aspiration of the Syrian people for security, stability, development and prosperity.
- Palestine: President Mahmoud Abbas of the Fatah-led government based in the West Bank emphasized the necessity of respecting the unity, sovereignty, and territorial integrity of Syria, expressing the full solidarity of the State of Palestine and its people with the brotherly Syrian people. In addition, Hamas, the de facto government of the Gaza Strip, congratulated the Syrian people for achieving their "aspirations for freedom and justice," and said that it "stand[s] strongly with the great people of Syria," their "will," "independence," and their "political choices." Hamas also expressed hope that the new Syrian government would continue "its historical and pivotal role in supporting the Palestinian people."
- Qatar: Foreign minister Sheikh Mohammed bin Abdulrahman Al Thani was critical of Assad's lack of action on societal, economic, and political issues during the periods of reduced fighting throughout the war. In remarks about the state of the Syrian Government Al Thani emphasized the importance of establishing a new political process and engaging in diplomacy with the new Syrian government.
- Tunisia: The Tunisian Foreign Ministry issued a statement stressing “the need to ensure the security of the Syrian people and to preserve the Syrian state as a unified and fully sovereign state in order to protect it from the danger of chaos, fragmentation and occupation and to reject any foreign interference in its affairs." Tunisia also expressed “its absolute solidarity with the brotherly Syrian people, who have deep fraternal ties with the Tunisian people."
- United Arab Emirates: The Ministry of Foreign Affairs called on all Syrian parties "to prioritize wisdom" and to fulfil "the aspirations and ambitions of all segments of the Syrian population". Anwar Gargash, a diplomatic adviser to President Sheikh Mohammed bin Zayed, said that Assad "failed to use the lifelines thrown to him by various Arab countries" and attributed his government's collapse as a political failure.
- Yemen: The information minister of Yemen's internationally recognized government, Moammar al-Eryani, condemned the Axis of Resistance, which he called Iran's "expansionist project, which used sectarian militias as tools to complete the Persian Crescent" and lauded its collapse. He added that the Yemeni people are "able to thwart the plans of Iran and its Houthi tool to violate their land and tamper with their destiny, just as those plans failed in Syria and Lebanon."

==== Other countries ====
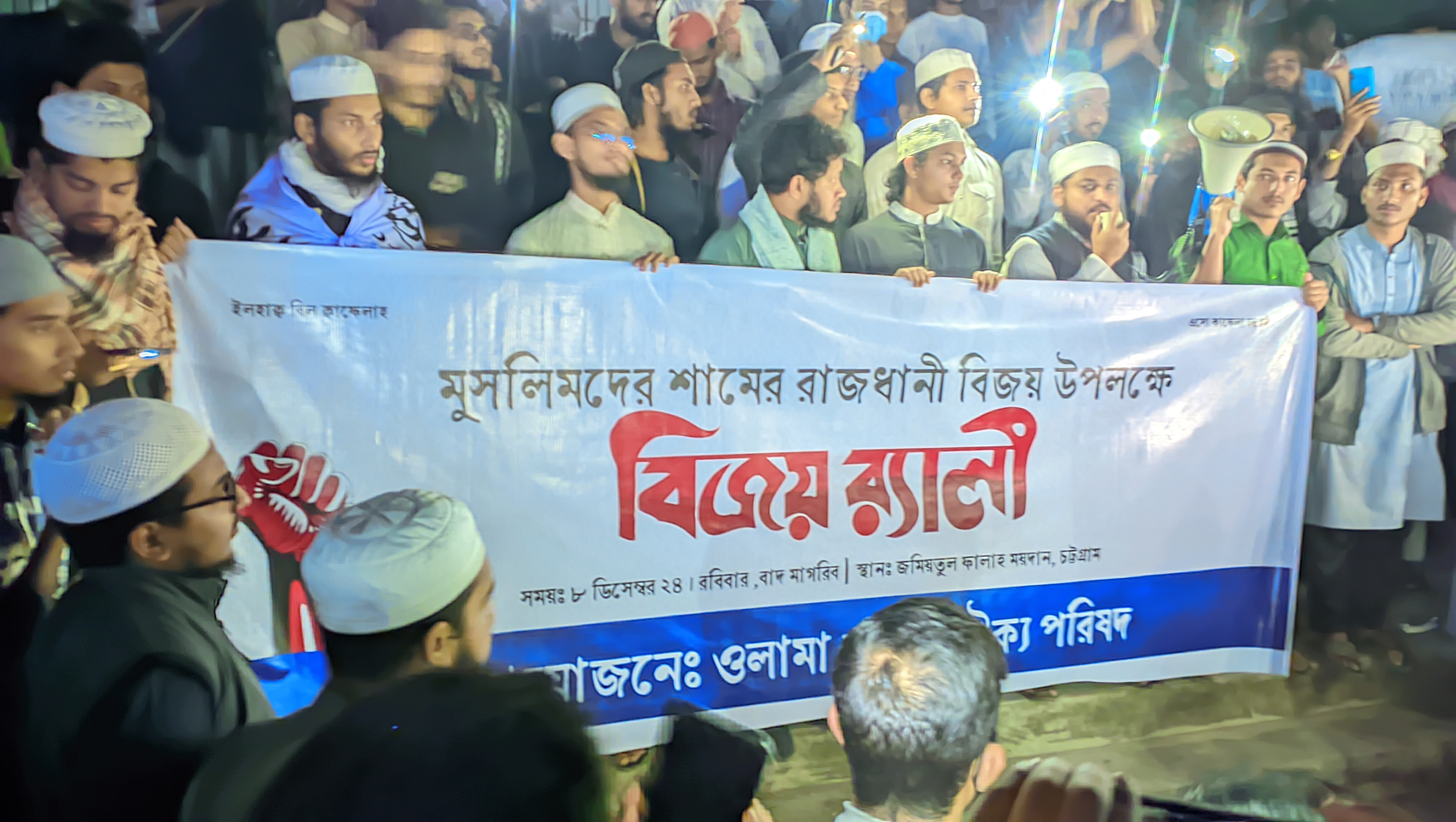
Celebrations in Chittagong, Bangladesh, after Assad's fall

- Afghanistan: The foreign ministry of the Taliban, which runs the de facto government of the Islamic Emirate of Afghanistan, congratulated the Syrian opposition and "the people of Syria", hoping for "a peaceful, unified and stable system."
- Armenia: The Armenian Foreign Ministry stated that they "stand firmly by the friendly Syrian people in this decisive moment for their history and support the inclusive and peaceful political transition process with a strong belief that tolerance and national unity are the only way to stability and peace in Syria and the entire region."
- Austria: The Austrian government said it was preparing a deportation plan for Syrians living in the country, with interior minister Gerhard Karner adding: "The focus will be on those who have become criminals, those who do not want to adapt to the cultural values in Europe or Austria, or those who do not want to work and therefore only live on social benefits."
- Azerbaijan: The Ministry of Foreign Affairs said that Azerbaijan is keeping an eye on events in Syria, that it supports Syria's sovereignty and territorial integrity, and that it hopes the issues will be settled in accordance with the wishes of the Syrian people and through internal political discussions.
- Chile: Matías Walker, a vice-president of the Senate of Chile, stated Venezuelan President Nicolás Maduro could meet the same fate as Assad due to the state of Iran and Russia. In contrast, the Communist Party of Chile expressed solidarity with Assad's government against the "terrorist coup", which they asserted was in the service of Israel and U.S. imperialism broadly and in the Gaza war.
- Colombia: President Gustavo Petro criticized Russian confirmation of Assad's fall, suggesting the "betrayal" could be indicative of an imminent alliance between Russia and the United States following Donald Trump's reelection. He suggested that Syria, like Afghanistan, Iraq and Libya, was heading in the rightward direction of Islamic fundamentalism, that Israel would make further territorial gains at its expense, and that the Shiite influence of Iran would grow. He claimed this situation could lead to "new alliances, [and] new betrayals", particularly regarding the isolation of Palestine and the Kurds. Open-ended questions he posited included implications for the Russian invasion of Ukraine, pan-Arabism and its secular ideals, Syrian oil and how it would affect the general market and the negotiating power of Cuba and Venezuela, and whether that market shift would affect the pink tide's fight for control in the Organization of American States. Two weeks later, he demanded that Russia, Iran, Turkey, Israel and the United States stop partitioning Syria, expressed concern about the threat of Kurdish genocide, and called for free elections in the country.
- Cuba: The Ministry of Foreign Affairs declared that they had been closely monitoring the rapidly unfolding events in Syria with a great deal of concern. They demanded that Syria's geographical integrity and sovereignty be maintained. On 5 December 2024, Cuban Minister of Foreign Affairs Bruno Rodríguez Parrilla spoke with Bassam al-Sabbagh over "escalating terrorism". Rodríguez expressed his nation's solidarity with Assad's government during the recent offensives. At the Cuban embassy in Turkey, ambassador Alejandro Francisco Díaz Palacios met with his Syrian counterpart and expressed similar solidarity.
- Cyprus: President Nikos Christodoulides called for a peaceful democratic transition in Syria. He added that Syria's unity, territorial integrity, and sovereignty must be upheld, and a peaceful, inclusive, and Syrian-led political transition is demanded according to UN Security Council Resolution 2254.
- Czech Republic: Prime Minister Petr Fiala said that "Assad's dependence on Russia ultimately failed". He voiced optimism for Syria's future, stressing the value of freedom and stability over anarchy or terrorist control.
- Greece: In accordance with UN Security Council Resolution 2254, the Greek Ministry of Foreign Affairs emphasized in a statement the pressing need for peace and a seamless transition to a democratically legitimated government. The ministry also conveyed the hope that the refugee issue would be resolved and that the safe return of Syrians to their homes would be made possible by the restoration of democratic rule.
- Holy See: Pope Francis urged the Syrian rebels who overthrew President Bashar al-Assad to bring stability to the nation and to lead with a spirit of unity.
- Iran: The Ministry of Foreign Affairs said that "determining Syria's future and making decisions about its destiny are solely the responsibility of the Syrian people", adding that it "respects Syria's unity and national sovereignty" and pleaded for armed conflicts to immediately cease. The Iranian leadership said it was committed to international efforts supporting the political process and expressed confidence that their strong relations would persist. Supreme Leader Ali Khamenei said "There should be no doubt that what has happened in Syria is the result of a joint American and Zionist plan. Yes, a neighboring country of Syria has played a clear role in this regard, continues to do so even now—this is evident to everyone. But the main conspirator, the primary planner, and the central command rooms are in the US and the Zionist entity". He added that "The aggressors I mentioned each have their own motives. Their goals are different—some seek to occupy land in northern or southern Syria, while America aims to solidify its foothold in the region" and said "These are their objectives, and time will show that, God willing, none of them will achieve these goals. The occupied regions of Syria will be liberated by the brave Syrian youth; have no doubt, this will happen". Parliament Speaker Mohammad Bagher Qalibaf claimed that the Assad regime had disregarded Iran's warnings of an opposition offensive.
  - Iranian opposition: Reza Pahlavi, the last heir apparent to the throne of the Imperial State of Iran and leader of the self-styled Iran National Council, an exiled opposition group, hailed the fall of Assad regime as a signal of a future fall of the Islamic Republic regime.
- Ireland: Taoiseach Simon Harris stated that while the world should be happy that the Assad regime has fallen, action must now be taken to stop tyranny and anarchy from taking its place. He went on to say that Syrians must decide the country's future through free and fair elections and a peaceful transition.
- Israel: Prime Minister Benjamin Netanyahu welcomed the events and said the end of the Assad government "is a direct result of the blows we have inflicted on Iran and Hezbollah". The Israel Defense Forces (IDF) maintained close surveillance of the situation, particularly regarding Iranian movements, while also claiming to have supported United Nations forces in repelling attacks by armed groups. IDF chief Herzi Halevi said there would be more enforcements at the Syrian border as a precaution for potential attacks by "local factions". Shortly after the regime collapsed, Israel invaded Syria's Quneitra Governorate.
- Peru: The Ministry of Foreign Affairs advised Peruvians in the area to contact the Peruvian embassy in Egypt.
  - Presidential hopeful Vicky Dávila asserted that Assad's fall was beneficial for the world order and sent a message to dictators that their regimes were collapsible. Also addressed were Colombian president Petro's comments on Assad's alliances, which she claimed were weak as each partner – Iran, Russia, and Hezbollah – was occupied by other issues.
- Singapore: According to the Ministry of Foreign Affairs' spokesperson, Singapore was keeping a careful eye on events in Syria. An inclusive political process led by Syria is the only way to definitively settle the complex issue in line with UN Security Council Resolution 2254. Syria's independence, sovereignty, and territorial integrity must all be respected in any significant political resolution.
- Spain: Foreign minister José Manuel Albares said that "we want the Syrians to decide their future and we want it to be peaceful, stable and guaranteeing territorial integrity".
- Switzerland: The Federal Department of Foreign Affairs urged all sides to uphold international humanitarian law and safeguard civilians. Switzerland affirmed it was advocating for peace and harmony in Syria.
- Ukraine: Foreign minister Andrii Sybiha said that Assad's downfall was the inevitable result of relying on Russian support, adding that Russian president Vladimir Putin "always betrays those who rely on him."

==== Partially recognized states ====
- Sahrawi Republic: The Ministry of Foreign Affairs issued a statement indicating that the Sahrawi Arab Democratic Republic in Western Sahara was closely following the developments in Syria, expressing its "sympathy and solidarity with the brotherly people of Syria". The Ministry also called for the international community to stand with Syria and its people in their efforts to build democratic institutions, while also expressing concerns over Syria's need to secure its borders and protect its interests "away from any foreign interference". The Sahrawi Republic was recognized by and maintained close relations with the Syrian Arab Republic.

=== Syrian refugee policy ===
The government of Switzerland suspended their asylum processings for Syrian nationals citing the need to evaluate whether they were eligible or should be deported. Other European nations — including Germany, Austria, Liechtenstein, Belgium, Greece, Italy, Sweden, Denmark, and the United Kingdom — have all announced plans to pause asylum applications for Syrian people seeking asylum. This includes both new applications and those that are still being processed. Several Nordic countries also suspended their asylum process. The German government said they were monitoring the situation in Syria, while Hungary announced the deportation of Syrian refugees. German politician Alice Weidel called for their deportation, citing that because Syria was "free", their citizens do not have to escape the country anymore and hence should return. In response, the foreign ministry said Assad's downfall does not "guarantee [...] peaceful developments".

== Supranational actors ==
United Nations relief chief Thomas Fletcher said on Twitter that the organisation was observing the events and concerned. Special envoy for Syria, Geir Otto Pedersen, requested for urgent discussions to maintain an "orderly political transition". He called Assad's downfall "a watershed moment in Syria's history" and expressed hope for "peace, reconciliation, dignity, and inclusion for all Syrians." On 9 December, following a confidential discussion, American and Russian diplomats said the United Nations Security Council would publish a statement within several days. Russia's ambassador Vasily Nebenzya said the council generally agreed to ensure territorial sovereignty and unity, safeguarding civilians and for humanitarian aid to reach those in need. United States ambassador Robert Wood also verified Nebenzya's statement. Both diplomats called the regime's collapse "unexpected". China's ambassador, Fu Cong, emphasized an inclusive political process, stability, and preventing terrorist activities.

The European Union High Representative of the Union for Foreign Affairs and Security Policy, Kaja Kallas, stated that Assad's regime collapse was "a positive and long-awaited development. It also shows the weakness of Assad's backers Russia and Iran." She added that maintaining security in the area was the highest priority. European Commission President Ursula von der Leyen tweeted: "The cruel Assad dictatorship has collapsed. This historic change in the region offers opportunities but is not without risks." European Parliament president Roberta Metsola said: "This is a critical period for the region and for the millions of Syrians who want a free, stable and secure future. What happens in the next hours and days matters."

== Public ==
Thousands of Syrians assembled at the main square of Damascus, chanting "freedom", particularly in the symbolic Umayyad Square, traditionally a centre of government authority housing the by-then evacuated Ministry of Defence and Syrian Armed Forces headquarters. Jubilation occurred across the city following an announcement by the Syrian rebels claiming President Bashar al-Assad's rule had ended. Civilians gathered around abandoned military equipment, with social media footage documenting celebrations including music and public demonstrations. People voiced opposition to Assad through chants and celebratory car horn honking. Some celebrators entered the presidential palace to loot tableware, furniture and other properties while others destroyed portraits of Assad. Banners of Assad hung on buildings were also set ablaze by them.

Various Syrian and other Muslim celebrities shared varied reactions to the regime's collapse on social media. Around the world, exiled Syrian activists and members of the diaspora celebrated the fall of Assad's regime. Syrian refugees in Paris, London, Stockholm, Helsinki and Athens took part in public celebrations. Thousands of Syrians in Berlin, Germany, congregated along streets to celebrate the overthrow. In Neukölln, celebrators brought out the flag of the Syrian opposition and marched to Kreuzberg. In Lebanon, hundreds of people celebrated in Tripoli and Akkar, in the north of the country, and in Bar Elias, which are mostly populated by Sunni Muslims who oppose Hezbollah and the Assad government, after the fall of Damascus. The Syrian Ba'ath party office in Halba was stormed. In Egypt, thousands of Syrians also took to the streets in victory.

Syrian refugees in the hundreds showed up at the borders with Turkey and Lebanon as they prepared to return to the country. Border crossings in Jordan and Lebanon were closed. Lebanese border officials at the Masnaa Border Crossing closed its gates as Syrians attempted to cross the border. Meanwhile, citizens of neighboring countries reacted to the events positively. Iraq hosted 2,000 Syrian army troops who fled via the border town of Al-Qaim. Some injured soldiers received treatment in Iraq.

American late night talk show host Jon Stewart highlighted the collapse of the Assad regime in a broadcast on The Daily Show, describing it as "pure, unalloyed joy". A 2025 Arab Center for Research and Policy Studies survey that polled 3,690 people revealed that a clear majority of 79–81% of Syrians reported positive emotions such as hope, joy/happiness, safety, and relief following the regime's fall.

== Scholar analysis ==
Writing for the Council on Foreign Relations, Steven A. Cook expressed concern about the future of Syria's state following Assad's downfall. Although the opposition led by Tahrir al-Sham (HTS) avoids extreme measures, it has a history of exercising brute force. Critics and opponents of the group's leader, Ahmed al-Sharaa (then known by his nom de guerre Abu Mohammad al-Jolani), highlighted reports of abuses in HTS-controlled prisons in rebel-held Idlib Governorate. According to Cook, the mixed record suggests that while HTS aims to present itself as a more moderate force, it continues to exercise repressive governance in areas they control.

Jamie Dettmer of Politico said whether or not Syrian citizens have benefitted remains to be observed as the country has to develop without violent forces. In Idlib Governorate, the HTS reduced their hostility towards the Christian and Druze communities. Upon gaining control of Aleppo, al-Sharaa ensured that the Christian population would be unharmed and church services proceeded without interruption. Al-Sharaa previously said in an interview on CNN that the HTS's main agenda was to redevelop Syria.

Foreign Policy analyst Lina Khatib compared the regime's collapse to the fall of the Berlin Wall in 1989. In both instances, a chain reaction of event sequences led to the wall's collapse. Similarly, Assad's downfall was contributed by external conflicts such as the Israel significantly weakening Hezbollah, Iran losing key proxy powers, and Russia's involvement with its invasion of Ukraine has eroded its presence in the Middle East. Khatib argues that the end of Assad's rule signifies a weakening anti-Western and anti-Israel "resistance" attitude within the Middle East. It also alludes to a shift in power towards Israel and its Gulf allies and an emphasis on economic and security cooperation rather than conflict.

== See also ==
- Reactions to the execution of Saddam Hussein
- International reactions to the killing of Muammar Gaddafi
- Domestic responses to the Egyptian revolution of 2011
- International reactions to the Egyptian revolution of 2011
