= Fall of the Assad regime =

End of Assadist rule in Syria

- Part of the 2024 Syrian opposition offensives in the Syrian civil war, and the Middle Eastern crisis (2023–present)
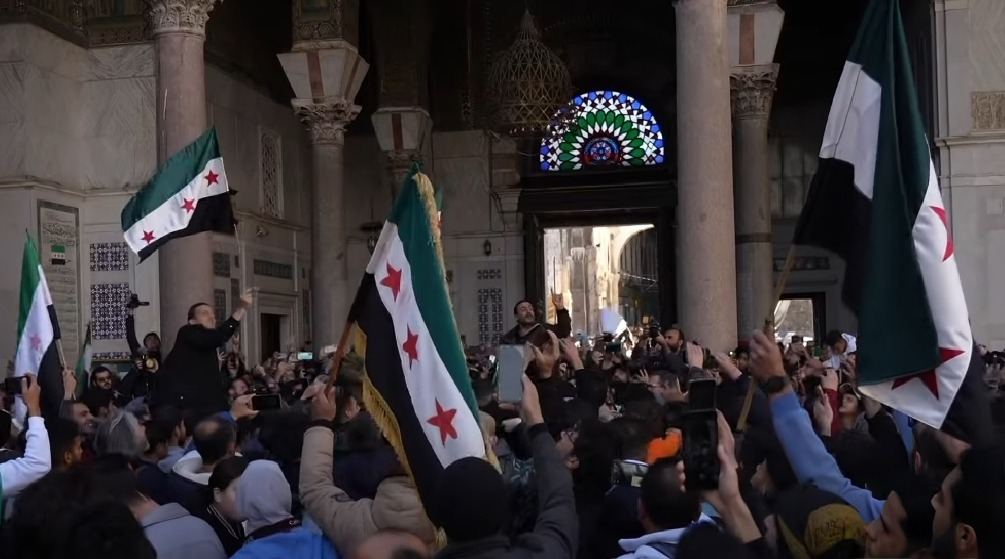
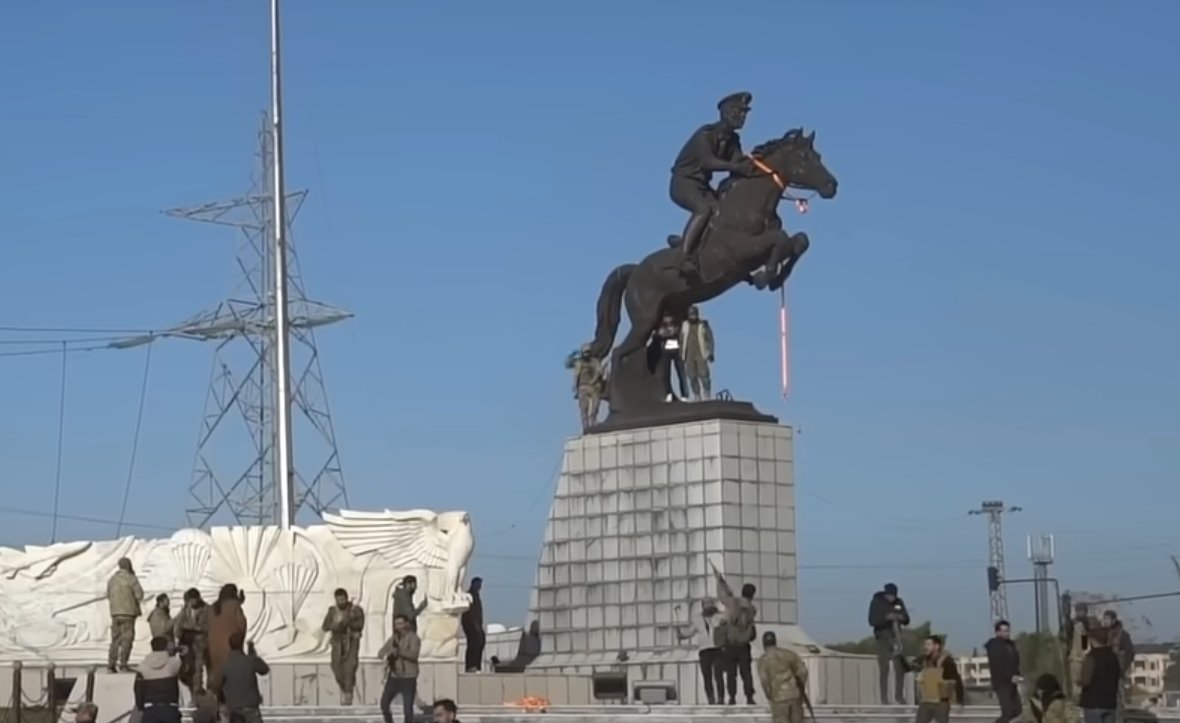
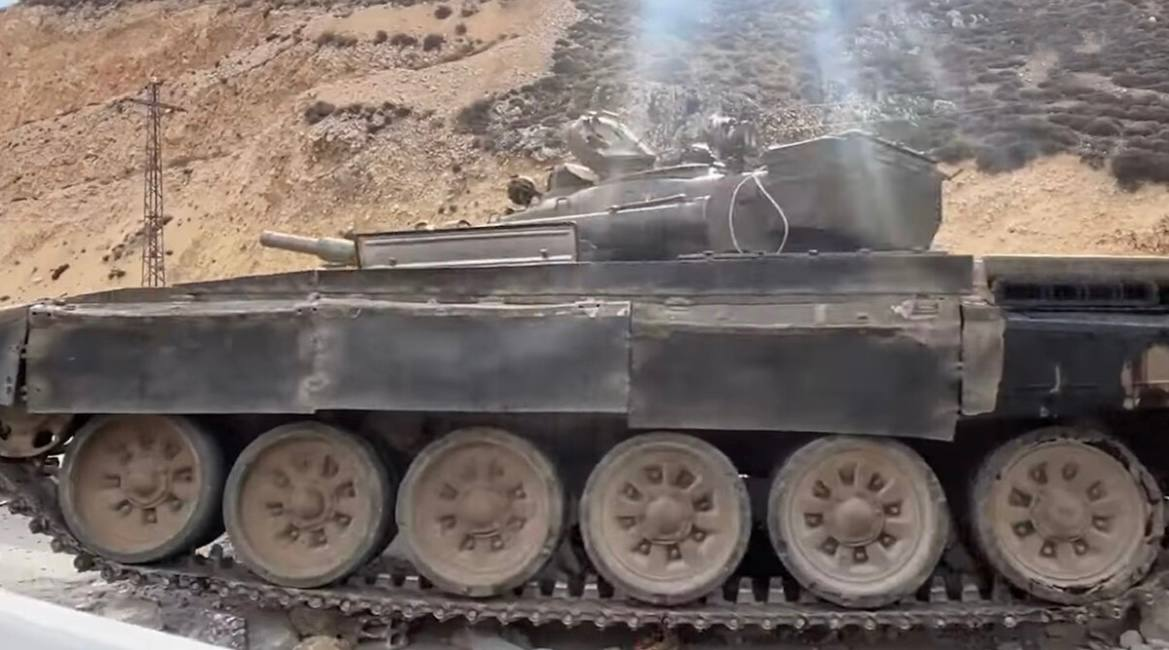
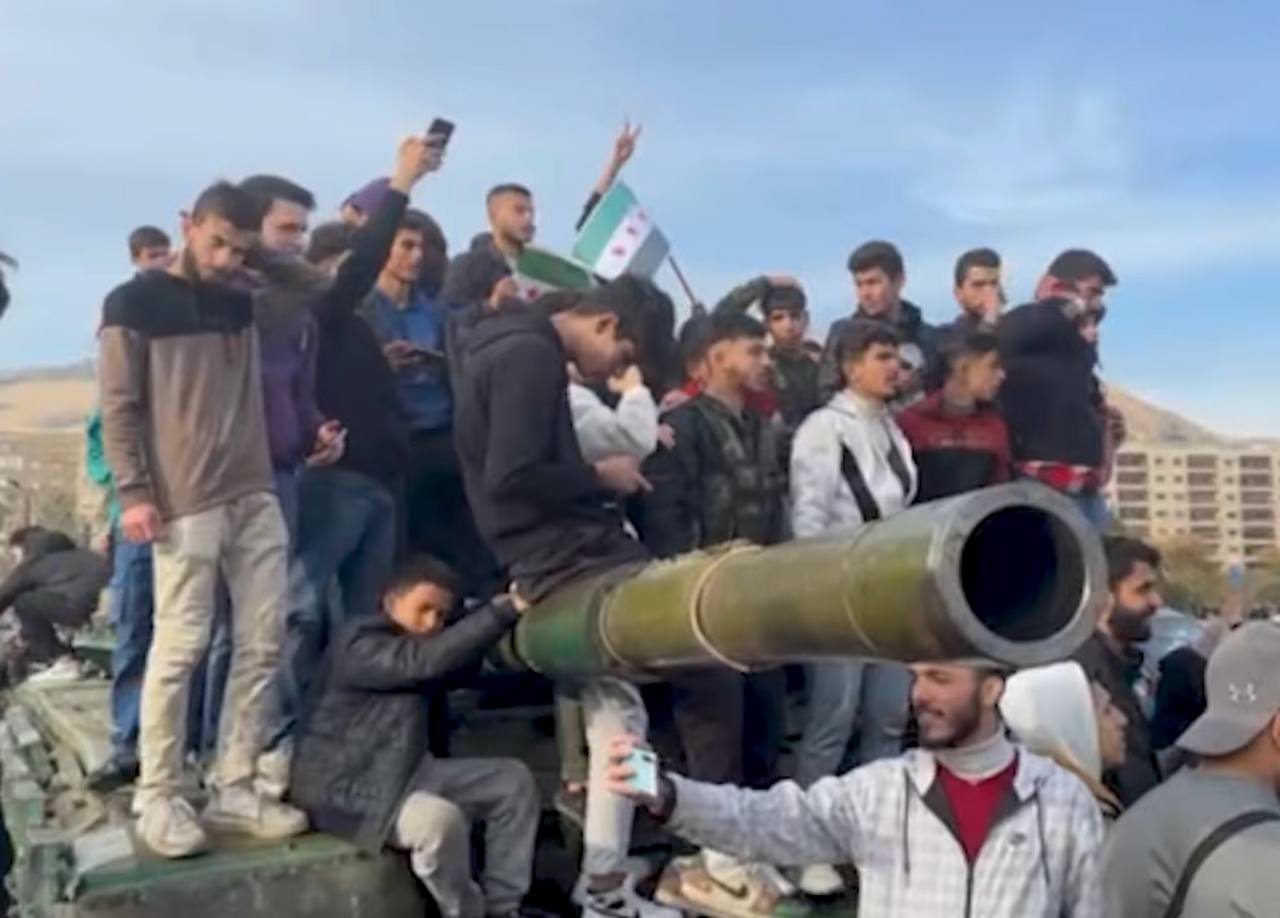
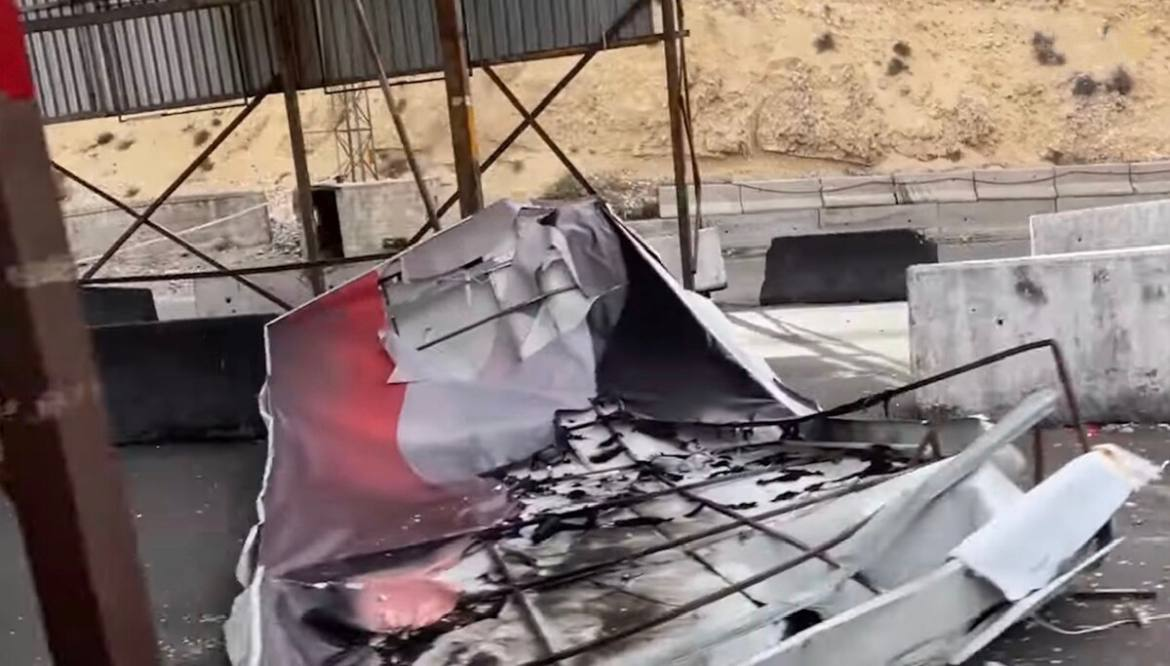
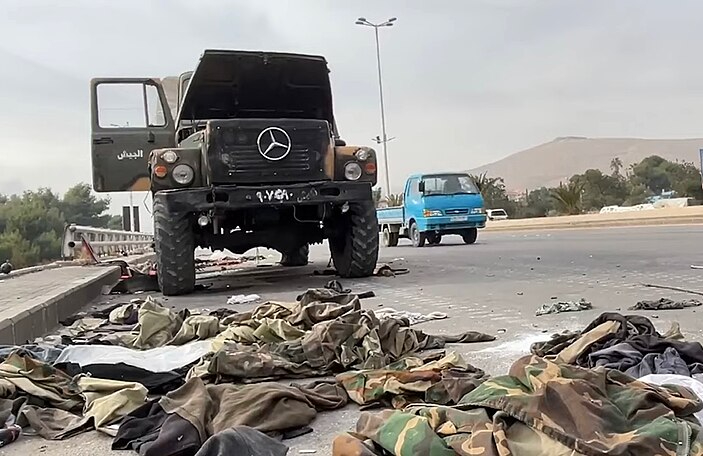
- From top, clockwise: Syrians celebrating in the Umayyad Mosque in Damascus; Rebels at a statue of Bassel al-Assad, later pulled down; Syrian citizens celebrating on an abandoned tank in Damascus; Abandoned trucks and military uniforms; A destroyed image of Bashar al-Assad; T-72 tank abandoned by pro-regime forces
- Date: 8 December 2024; 23 months ago
- Location: Syria
- Organised by: Syrian opposition; Syrian Salvation Government; Hay'at Tahrir al-Sham; (Syrian opposition) Syrian National Army; (Syrian opposition) Southern Operations Room
- Outcome: Syrian opposition victory: Syrian opposition takes control of Damascus and most of Syria; Bashar al-Assad fled to Russia; Ahmed al-Sharaa became de facto leader of Syria.; Establishment of the Syrian caretaker government; End of the Syrian civil war; Start of the aftermath of the Syrian civil war

On 8 December 2024, the Assad regime in Syria collapsed during a major offensive by opposition forces. The offensive was spearheaded by Hay'at Tahrir al-Sham (HTS), the Syrian National Army (SNA), and the Southern Operations Room (SOR), as part of the Syrian civil war that began with the Syrian revolution in 2011. The capture of Syria's capital, Damascus, marked the end of the Assad family's rule, which had governed Syria as a totalitarian hereditary dictatorship since Hafez al-Assad assumed power in 1970 after a successful coup d'état.

As the SOR advanced towards Damascus, reports emerged that Bashar al-Assad had fled the capital aboard a plane to Russia, where he joined his family, already in exile, and was granted asylum. Following his departure, opposition forces declared victory on state television. Concurrently, the Russian Ministry of Foreign Affairs confirmed Assad's resignation and departure from Syria.

The swift fall of the Assad regime was met with shock and surprise throughout the world, and among the Syrian people as well. Syrian opposition fighters were reportedly surprised at how quickly the Assad government had collapsed in the wake of their offensive. Analysts viewed the event as a significant blow to Iran's Axis of Resistance due to their use of Assad's Syria as a waypoint to supply arms and supplies to Hezbollah, a key ally. Several Western academics and geopolitical commentators likened the regime's collapse to the fall of the Berlin Wall in 1989, comparing the broader geopolitical shifts that occurred after both events.

== Background ==
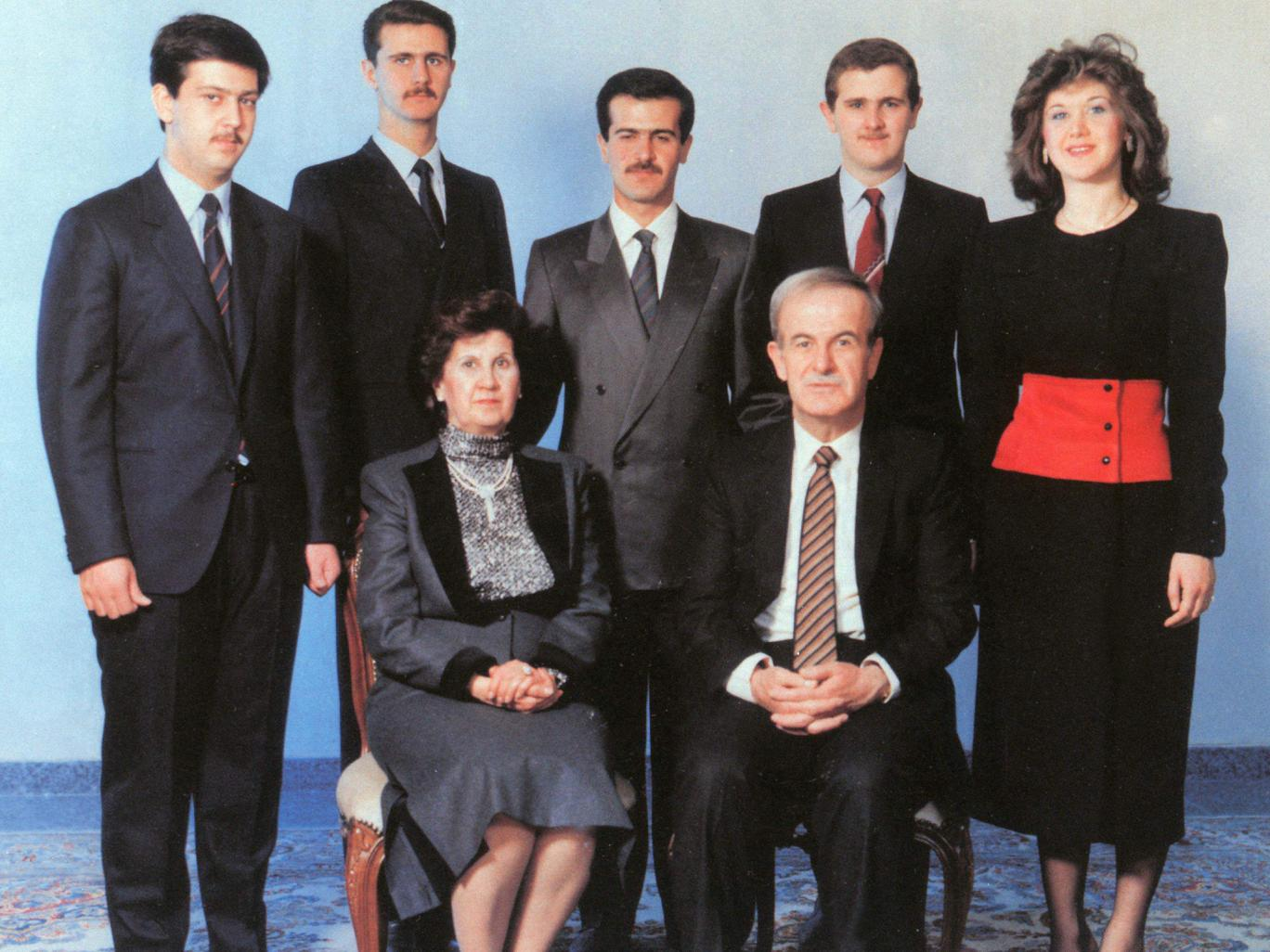
The Assad family, c. 1993. Front: Anisa Makhlouf and Hafez al-Assad. Rear, left to right: Maher, Bashar, Bassel, Majd, and Bushra al-Assad.

The Assad family had ruled Syria since 1971, when Hafez al-Assad seized power and became the president of Syria under the Syrian Ba'ath Party. After his death in June 2000, he was succeeded by his son Bashar al-Assad.

Hafez al-Assad built his governmental system as a bureaucracy that was marked by a distinct cult of personality. Images, portraits, quotes and praises of Assad were displayed everywhere from schools to public markets and government offices. He was referred to as the "Immortal Leader" and the "Sanctified One" (al-Muqaddas). Assad reorganized Syrian society along militaristic lines, persistently invoked conspiratorial rhetoric on the dangers of foreign-backed plots abetted by fifth columnists, and promoted the armed forces as a central aspect of public life.

After Hafez al-Assad's seizure of power in 1970, state propaganda promoted a new national discourse based on unifying Syrians under "a single imagined Ba'athist identity," as well as Assadism. Fervently loyalist paramilitaries known as the Shabiha (transl. 'ghosts') deified Assad and pursued psychological warfare against non-conformist populations.

=== Bashar al-Assad ===
After Hafez al-Assad's death, his son and successor Bashar al-Assad inherited the existing personality cult, with the party hailing him as the "Young Leader" and "Hope of the People." Drawing influence from North Korea's hereditary leadership model, official propaganda in Syria ascribed divine features to the Assad family and revered the Assad patriarchs as the founding fathers of modern Syria.

Bashar had reportedly began to fear the possibility of being overthrown in the future as early as the 2003 invasion of Iraq. In 2011, the United States, European Union, and most Arab League countries called for Assad to resign following the crackdown on Arab Spring protesters during the events of the Syrian Revolution, which led to the Syrian civil war. As of 2022 the civil war had killed around 580,000 people, of whom at least 306,000 were non-combatants. According to the Syrian Network for Human Rights, pro-Assad forces caused more than 90% of the civilian deaths. The Assad government perpetrated numerous war crimes during the course of the Syrian civil war, (Note: Sources:) and Assad's military, the Syrian Arab Armed Forces, also carried out several attacks with chemical weapons. The deadliest chemical attack was a sarin gas strike in Ghouta on 21 August 2013, which killed between 281 and 1,729 people. (Note: at least 281 (French intelligence); at least 350 (UK intelligence); 355 (MSF); 494 (Damascus Media Office); 502 (SOHR); 635 (SRGC); 923 (VDC); 1,300 (SNC); 1,338 (LCC); 1,144 (SNHR); 1,429 (United States); 1,729 (FSA))

In December 2013, the United Nations High Commissioner for Human Rights Navi Pillay stated that findings from an inquiry by the UN implicated Assad in war crimes. Investigations by the OPCW-UN Joint Investigative Mechanism and OPCW-UN IIT concluded, respectively, that the Assad government was responsible for the 2017 Khan Shaykhun sarin attack and 2018 Douma chemical attack. On 15 November 2023, France issued an arrest warrant against Bashar al-Assad over the use of banned chemical weapons against civilians in Syria. Assad categorically denied the allegations, and accused foreign countries, especially the United States, of attempting regime change.

== Opposition takeover ==
=== Military advances ===
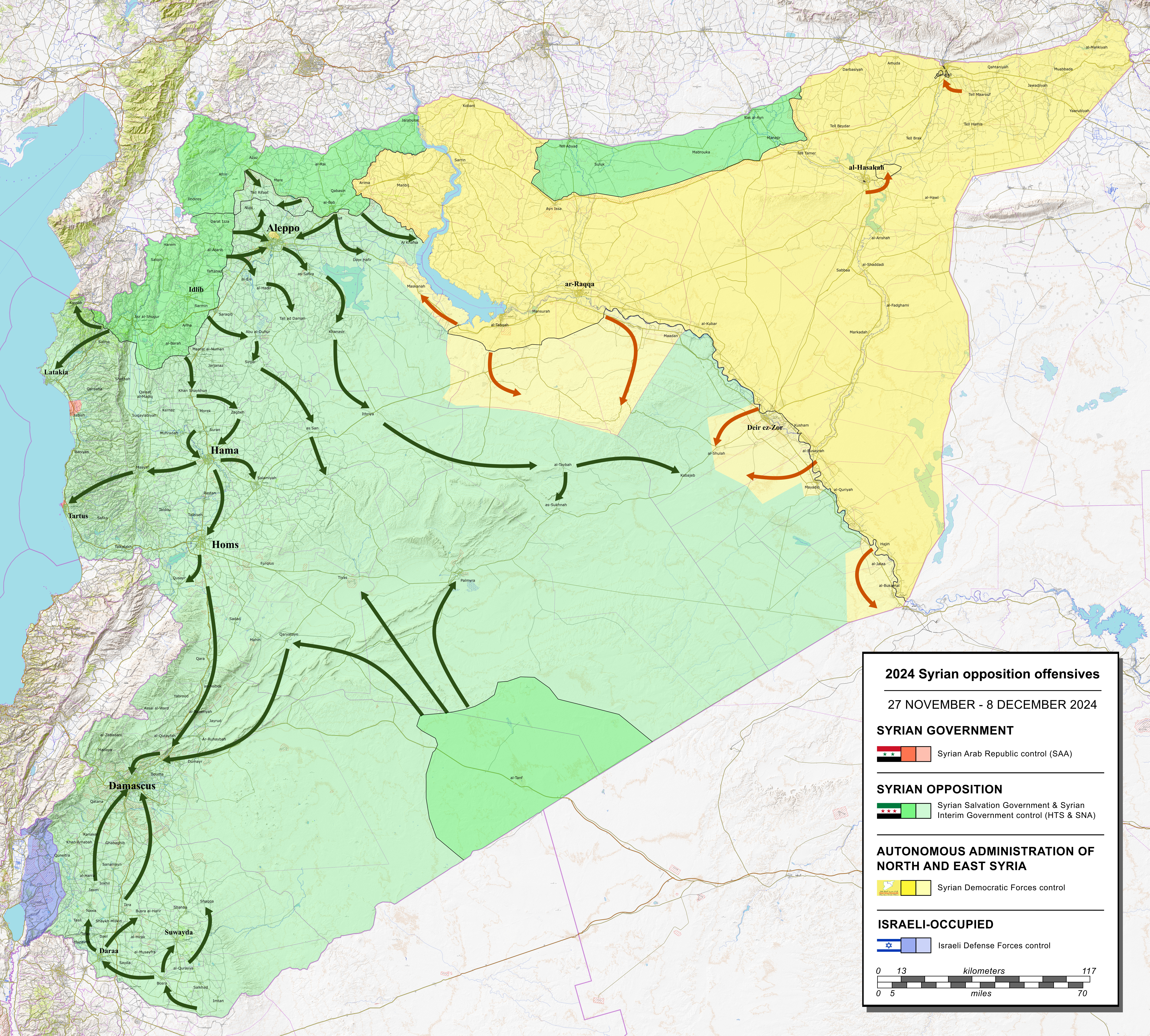
Map of the 2024 Syrian opposition offensives

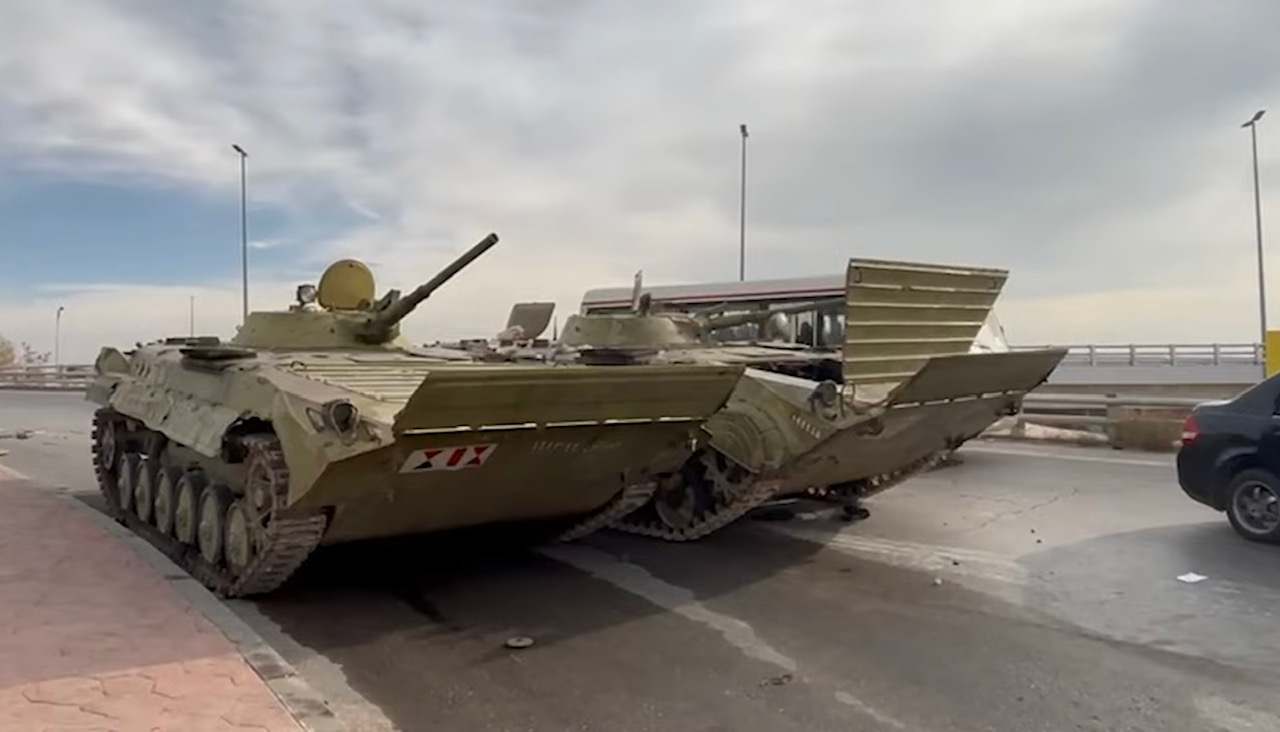
Armoured vehicles abandoned by the Syrian Arab Army

Planning by Syrian opposition forces for a military offensive against Aleppo began in late 2023 but was delayed by Turkish objections. Turkish president Recep Tayyip Erdoğan sought negotiations with the Assad government, to "determine Syria's future together," but received a negative response, following which he allowed the HTS-led opposition troops to begin their offensive against the Assad government.

On 6 December, in a face-to-face interview with CNN, Abu Mohammad al-Julani declared that the offensive's goal was to remove Assad from power. Using his birth name, Ahmed al-Sharaa, he explicitly pledged to protect minority groups and outlined plans for establishing a government grounded in institutions and a "council chosen by the people". He also expressed his intention to facilitate the return of Syrian refugees to their homes.

On 7 December 2024, opposition forces secured complete control of Homs following approximately twenty-four hours of concentrated military engagement. The rapid collapse of government defenses resulted in the hasty withdrawal of security forces, who destroyed sensitive documentation during their retreat. The capture granted insurgent forces control over critical transportation infrastructure, particularly the highway junction connecting Damascus to the Alawite coastal region, where both Assad's support base and Russian military installations were situated.

Assad-allied Hezbollah forces withdrew from nearby al-Qusayr, evacuating approximately 150 armored vehicles and hundreds of fighters. The reduction in support from key allies, including Russia's diminished involvement due to its focus on its invasion of Ukraine, and Hezbollah's concurrent engagement in conflict with Israel, were believed to contribute to the government's weakened position.

The takeover of Homs by opposition forces prompted widespread public celebrations, with residents participating in street demonstrations. Celebrants chanted anti-Assad slogans including: "Assad is gone, Homs is free" and "Long live Syria, down with Bashar al-Assad", removed government symbols which included portraits of Assad, while opposition fighters conducted victory celebrations including celebratory gunfire.

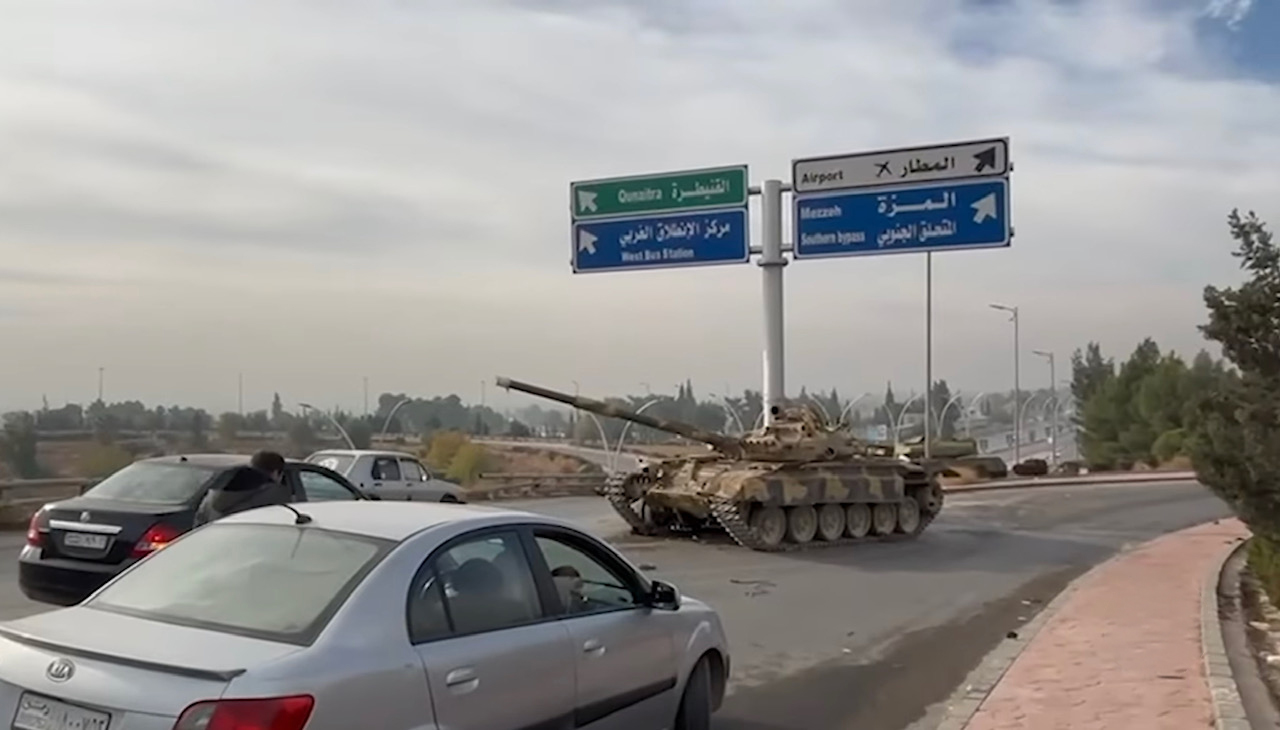
Abandoned army tank on a highway.

On 7 December, Syrian rebels announced that they started surrounding Damascus after capturing nearby towns, with rebel commander Hassan Abdul Ghani stating that "our forces have begun implementing the final phase of encircling the capital Damascus." The rebels started encircling the capital after capturing Al-Sanamayn, a town 20 kilometres (12 mi) from the southern entrance of Damascus. By the evening, pro-government forces had left the towns on the outskirts of Damascus, including Jaramana, Qatana, Muadamiyat al-Sham, Darayya, Al-Kiswah, Al-Dumayr, Daraa and sites near the Mezzeh Air Base.

The Syrian Army attempted to maintain public order through state media broadcasts, urging citizens to disregard what they termed "false news" aimed at destabilizing national security. Military leadership assured the population of their continued commitment to defending the country, though their ability to do so appeared increasingly limited. Opposition reconnaissance units penetrated the capital's defences, establishing positions in strategic locations throughout the city. Special operations teams conducted unsuccessful searches for Assad within Damascus.

In April 2025, Israeli prime minister Benjamin Netanyahu claimed that Israeli F-16 fighter jets intercepted Iranian aircraft suspected to be carrying airborne divisions to assist the Assad regime at some point during the opposition offensive, forcing them to turn back.

=== Loss of political control ===
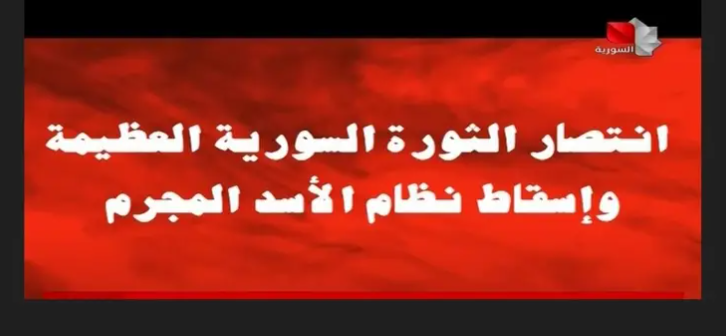
"Victory of the great Syrian revolution and the fall of the criminal Assad regime" on Syrian state TV after Damascus fell to the rebels. This was its sole broadcast for several hours.

In the main square of Jaramana, protestors took down a statue of Hafez al-Assad. In the evening, pro-government forces reportedly withdrew from several suburbs where large-scale protests had broken out.

Senior Assad government officials in Damascus reportedly engaged in negotiations with opposition forces regarding potential defections. These developments coincided with Iranian officials' denial of reports suggesting Assad had fled the country, though sources indicated his whereabouts in Damascus remained unknown. Following the entrance of opposition forces, Assad's presidential guard was no longer deployed at his usual residence. By the early evening of 7 December 2024 rebel forces attempting to find Assad had found no useful intelligence on his whereabouts.

On 8 December, Ha'yat Tahrir al-Sham announced on its official X account that it had released its prisoners from Sednaya Prison in Damascus's periphery, one of Syria's largest detention facilities. The organization deemed the release as a symbolic and strategic victory for its forces in the face of prior human rights abuses, and representative of the downfall of the Assad government's injustices. After its capture of Sednaya Prison, Hay'at Tahrir al-Sham published a list of escaped prison staff, who became among the most wanted fugitives in Syria after the Assad family.

The opposition's entry into Damascus met minimal resistance, due to an apparent lack of military dispatches to areas of the city and the rapid dissolution of government defensive positions, allowing the capture of several districts. The Syrian Observatory for Human Rights (SOHR) confirmed that opposition forces successfully seized several critical facilities in Damascus, including the state-media General Organization of Radio and TV building and Damascus International Airport. Their advance also secured control of major transportation arteries and strategic neighbourhoods, particularly the influential Mezzeh district, where the Presidential Palace of Syria is located.

=== Departure of the Assad family ===
First Lady Asma al-Assad had moved to Russia with the couple's three children about a week before opposition forces had begun their advance toward Damascus. Concurrent reports indicated that members of Assad's extended family, including relatives from his sister's lineage, took refuge in the United Arab Emirates. In the days before the opposition's advance, Egyptian and Jordanian officials were reported to have urged Bashar al-Assad to leave the country and form a government-in-exile, although the Egyptian Foreign Ministry and the Jordanian embassy denied doing so.

In the early hours of 8 December, Assad departed from Latakia International Airport to Moscow, Russia in a private aircraft, after which government troops stationed at the facility were dismissed from their posts. According to Rami Abdel Rahman (SOHR), Bashar al-Assad had "left Syria via Damascus international airport". Following efforts by Russian foreign minister Sergey Lavrov to facilitate his departure, Assad, who left under great secrecy, was reported to have gone first to the Russian-operated Khmeimim Air Base near Latakia before proceeding to Moscow. Mikhail Ulyanov (Russia's ambassador to international organizations in Vienna) announced on Telegram that Assad and his family had been granted asylum in Russia. The Russian government said that Assad resigned the presidency following a personal decision. On 16 December, the Telegram account of the Syrian presidency published a statement attributed to Assad saying that he had gone to a Russian military base in Latakia Governorate "to oversee combat operations" following the fall of Damascus but was evacuated out of the country by Russia after coming under siege from rebel forces, adding that he had no intention of resigning or going into exile.

The brother of Bashar al-Assad Maher al- Assad, fled alongside him to Russia via a military aircraft, traveling from Damascus to Latakia, and subsequently from Latakia to Moscow. While two of their cousins, Ihab and Iyad Makhlouf, tried to flee to Lebanon by car but were reportedly ambushed by rebels who killed Ihab and injured Iyad. On 27 December, Rasha Khazem, the wife of Bashar's cousin Duraid Assad — who is in turn the son of Bashar's uncle Rifaat al-Assad, was arrested along with her daughter Shams in Lebanon while they were attempting to fly out to Egypt. Rifaat was reported to have left via Lebanon the previous day. The Syrian embassy in Beirut was subsequently closed after reports emerged that Rasha and Shams' passports were forged at the office.

Following the departures of members of the Assad family, videos showing groups of people entering and exploring inside Bashar al-Assad's empty residence in al-Maliki were circulated online.

=== Dissolution of the Syrian government ===
Following Assad's departure, the Syrian Arab Army Command gave an announcement to its soldiers and officers that they were no longer in service as of 8 December 2024, claiming the Assad government had ceased to exist. Rebel forces took control over local TV stations and broadcast a message announcing victory against Assad's forces. At this point, organized resistance to the takeover ceased. Syrian army divisions were reported to be abandoning their uniforms and weapons to change into civilian clothing during and after the fall of Damascus.

Certain figures of the dissolved government, such as Syrian Prime Minister Mohammad Ghazi al-Jalali, remained in Damascus and promised to cooperate with the opposition. However, many members of the government, especially those involved in military activities, have fled the country and their current whereabouts are unknown. Others are believed to be taking refuge in their hometowns in Alawite-majority areas. Besides Bashar al-Assad and his brother Maher, the fugitives include Minister of Defence Ali Mahmoud Abbas, Minister of the Interior Mohammad Khaled al-Rahmoun, the Chief of the General Staff Abdul Karim Mahmoud Ibrahim, and the head of the National Security Office Kifah Moulhem, alongside several others. The new Syrian government has offered rewards for information leading to the capture of fugitives involved in the previous government's military and prison apparatus. On 26 December, Mohammad Kanjo Hassan, the former head of the Syrian Arab Army's field court and chief of military justice was arrested in Tartus for sentencing "thousands of people" to death during the civil war. The SOHR said that nearly 300 Assad loyalists had been arrested nationwide by 29 December.

== Aftermath ==
=== Political transition ===
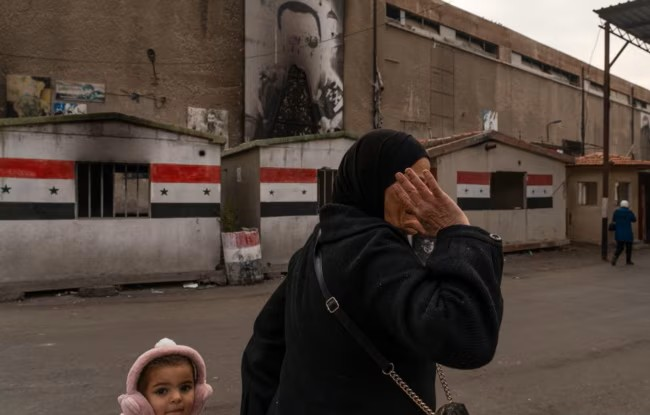
A destroyed image of Bashar al-Assad in Damascus

HTS leader Ahmed al-Sharaa stated on Telegram that Syrian public institutions would not immediately be given to its military forces, and would instead temporarily be held by Syrian Prime Minister Mohammad Ghazi al-Jalali until the full political transition was completed. Al-Jalali announced in a social media video that he planned to stay in Damascus and cooperate with the Syrian people, while expressing hope that Syria could become "a normal country" and begin to engage in diplomacy with other nations. Al-Sharaa called events "a new chapter in the history of the region" and condemned Syria's role as "a playground for Iranian ambitions," characterized by sectarianism and corruption.

Mohammed al-Bashir, head of the Syrian Salvation Government, was appointed by the Syrian General Command as the new Prime Minister of the Syrian caretaker government on 10 December 2024. HTS has assured that they will protect Christians and other minorities and allow them to freely practice their religion. On 31 December, al-Sharaa met with senior Syrian Christian leaders at the People's Palace.

VOA report about fears among Syrian minorities in the aftermath

On 29 January 2025, during the Syrian Revolution Victory Conference in Damascus, the Syrian General Command appointed al-Sharaa as president for the transitional period after he had served as the de facto leader following the fall of the Assad regime. As president, al-Sharaa announced plans to issue a "constitutional declaration" as a legal reference following the repeal of the 2012 constitution of Ba'athist Syria. On 12 February, two major organizations of the former Syrian opposition, the Syrian National Coalition and the Syrian Negotiation Commission, announced their allegiance to the caretaker government.

On 11 March, al-Sharaa signed an agreement with Mazloum Abdi, the commander of the Syrian Democratic Forces (SDF), to incorporate SDF-controlled institutions into the state, establish border crossings, and pledge to fight the remnants of the Assad regime. The deadline for the merger has been set for the end of 2025.

On 13 March, he signed a Constitutional Declaration for a transitional period of five years, enshrining Islamic law as a main derivation of jurisprudence and promising to protect the rights of all Syria's ethnic and religious groups. The Constitutional Declaration sets a presidential system with the executive power at the hands of the president who appoints the ministers, without the position of prime minister.

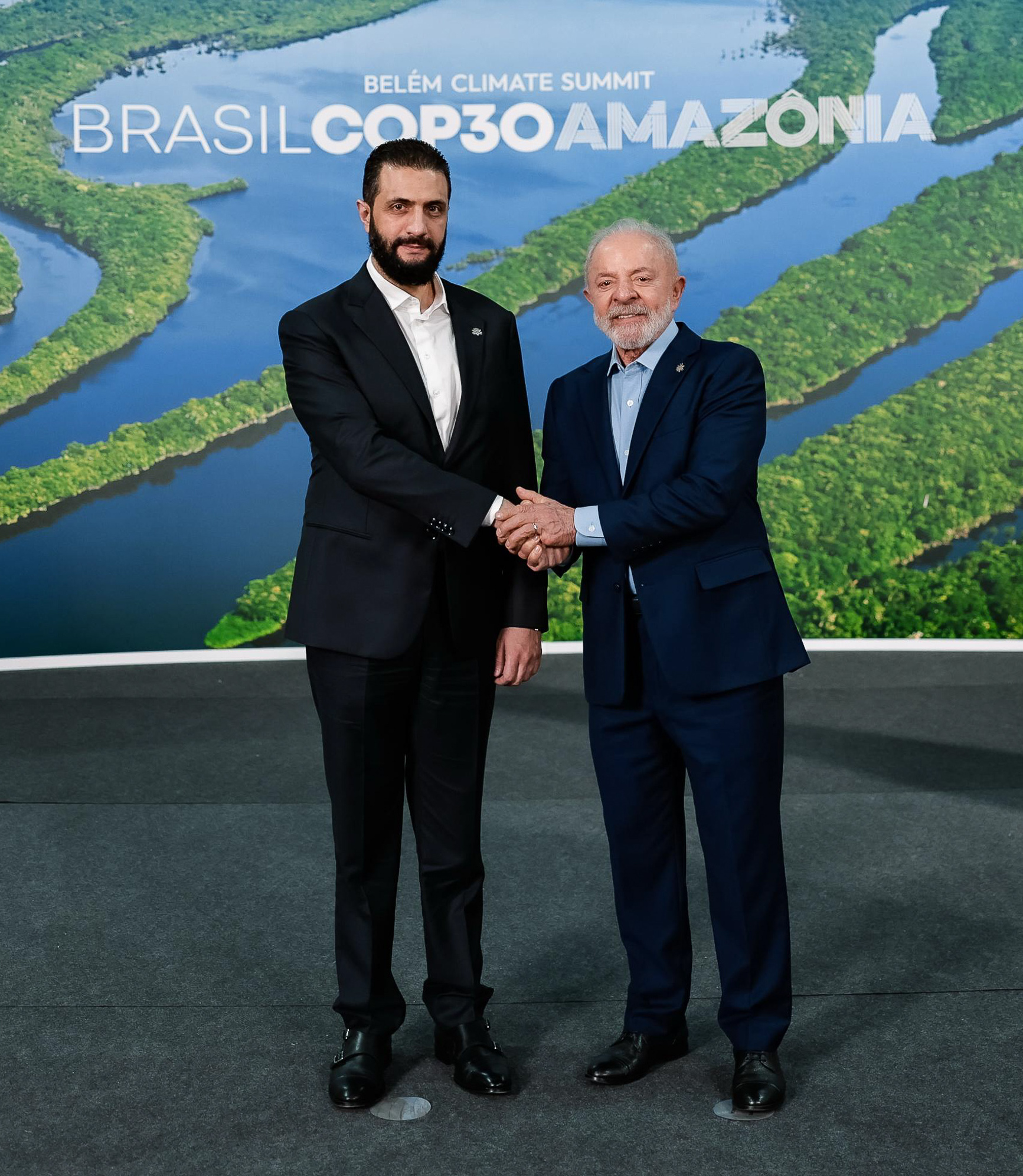
Syrian president Ahmed al-Sharaa with Brazilian President Luiz Inácio Lula da Silva, 6 November 2025

On 29 March, the Syrian transitional government was announced by al-Sharaa at a ceremony at the Presidential Palace in Damascus, in which the new ministers were sworn in and delivered speeches outlining their agendas. The government replaced the Syrian caretaker government, which was formed following the fall of the Assad regime. The post of prime minister was abolished.

Since then, a number of Western governments have lifted the sanctions on Syria, most notably the United States and the United Kingdom.

Alawites in Syria have been the target of increasing discrimination since the fall of the Ba'athist government, with calls for Alawite employees to be dismissed from the private sector while others called for them to be expelled from Damascus. This discrimination also spread to other minorities, including the Druze and Ismailis.

On 24 September, al-Sharaa addressed the general debate of the 80th session of the United Nations General Assembly, becoming the first Syrian leader to do so since Nureddin al-Atassi in 1967. (Note: Nureddin al-Atassi spoke after the Six-Day War, not during the general debate. Neither Hafez al-Assad nor Bashar al-Assad spoke at the UNGA during their presidencies.) In November 2025, al-Sharaa arrived in Brazil to attend the 2025 United Nations Climate Change Conference, marking the first time a Syrian president has participated in the annual climate summit since its establishment in 1995.

On 10 November, al-Sharaa met U.S. President Donald Trump in the Oval Office, marking the first visit by a Syrian president to the White House since Syria gained independence in 1946.

=== Israeli invasion ===
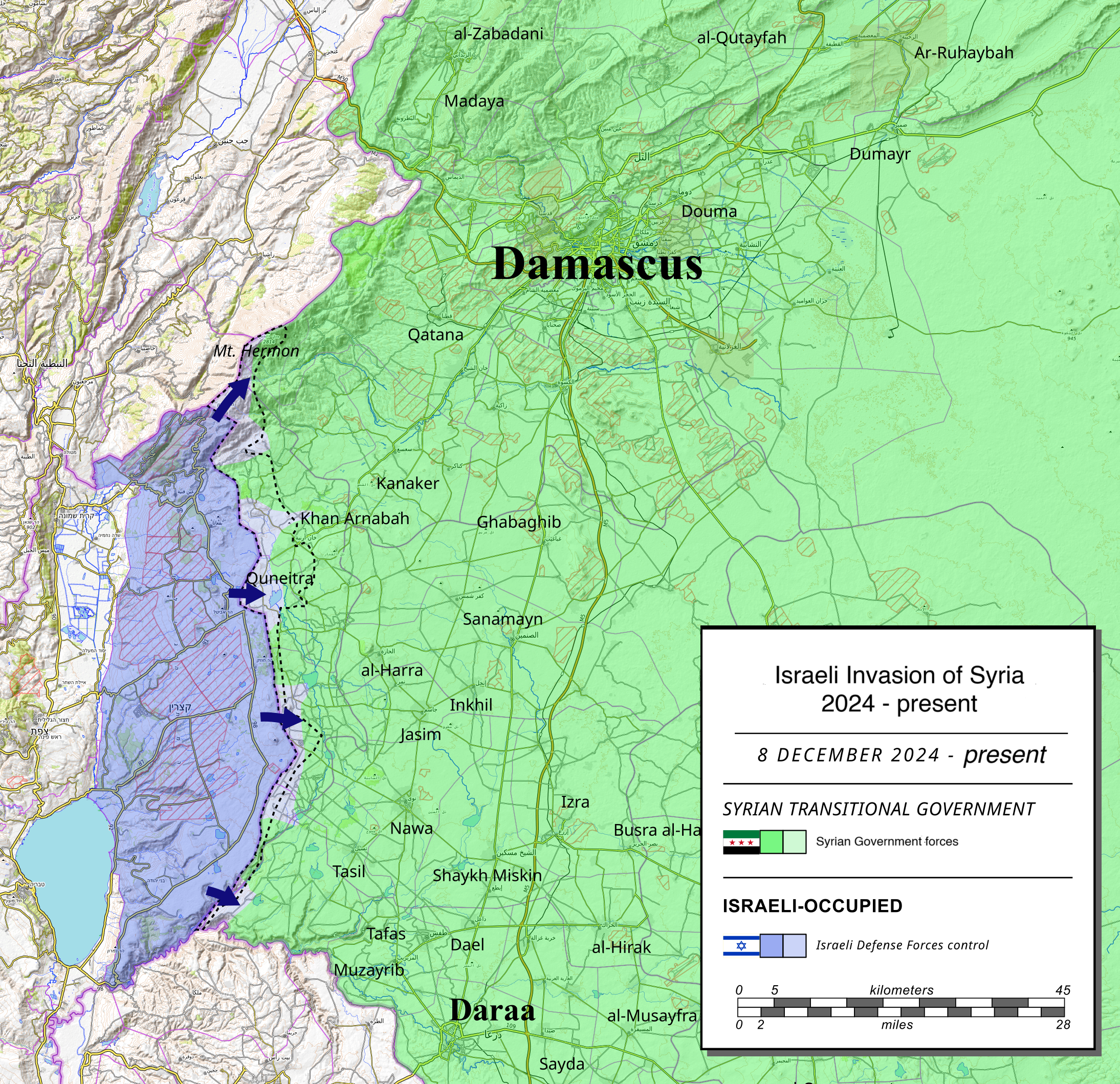
Israeli-occupied Golan Heights and Israeli invasion of Syria in December 2024

Israel Defence Forces (IDF) initiated military operations in Syria's Quneitra Governorate. Armored units advanced into the buffer zone between the Israeli-occupied Golan Heights and the rest of Syria, targeting areas including Tel Ayouba in the central Quneitra countryside with artillery fire. The operation marked the first time in 50 years that Israeli forces crossed the Purple Line, following ceasefire agreements on 31 May 1974 in the aftermath of the Yom Kippur War.

Israeli prime minister Benjamin Netanyahu said that since the Syrian Army had abandoned its positions, the 1974 border agreement with Syria had dissolved, and that to prevent any possible threat he had ordered the IDF to temporarily seize the buffer zone, from which the IDF had withdrawn in 1974, until an agreement was reached with the new government in Syria.

Israel carried out airstrikes in Syria, targeting Khalkhala air base, the Mazzeh district of Damascus, and suspected chemical weapon storage sites. Israel claimed to have carried out these airstrikes to prevent the fall of weapons to Syrian rebel groups.

=== Turkish offensive in northern Syria ===
Following the start of the 2024 Syrian opposition offensives, the Turkish Armed Forces and the Turkish-backed Syrian National Army (SNA) launched an offensive against the Kurdish-led Syrian Democratic Forces (SDF). The SDF governs the Democratic Autonomous Administration of North and East Syria (DAANES), a de facto autonomous region in northeast Syria. Turkish officials have called for the elimination of the Kurdish YPG, the SDF's main faction, while Turkish President Recep Tayyip Erdogan has threatened military intervention to force the region's reintegration into Syria. The offensive is aimed at expanding Turkish-controlled territory and dismantling Kurdish self-governance in post-Assad Syria.

On 30 November 2024, the SNA commenced Operation Dawn of Freedom with the objective of cutting off the SDF's supply lines and establishing a corridor connecting al-Bab, which has been under Turkish occupation since 2017, to the SDF-controlled town of Tell Rifaat. With the support of the Turkish Air Force, the SNA successfully captured Tel Rifaat and several surrounding villages from Kurdish forces. Turkey and the SNA subsequently launched an offensive against the SDF-controlled city of Manbij, pushing SDF forces eastward beyond the Euphrates river to enable the SNA to advance toward the Kurdish-majority city of Kobani. The SDF has repelled several SNA attempts to invade the Kobani area, but the Turkish and SNA bombardment of SDF-controlled territories has continued into 2025. The SDF agreed to integrate into state institutions on 10 March 2025.

=== Alleged attempt to establish an Alawite state ===
The December 2024 Syrian rebel offensives and the subsequent fall of the Assad regime sparked renewed speculation by some analysts about a potential revival of an Alawite state with Russian backing. For a brief period following the rebel takeover of Damascus, Latakia Governorate and Tartous Governorate (the historical territory of the Alawite State), were the only parts of Syria not under rebel control. Some Alawite villages there formed self-defence committees and set up checkpoints, but no expected Assadist national redoubt in the region came to fruition, partly because of the mixed attitudes of the Alawite population towards the HTS-led rebels.

According to the UK-based war monitor Syrian Observatory for Human Rights (SOHR), Assad sought to establish an Alawite state on the Syrian coast as a fallback plan. This proposed coastal statelet was reportedly intended to serve as a stronghold for his regime in the event of losing control over the rest of the country.

Russia, a key ally of Assad, allegedly rejected this plan, viewing it as an attempt to divide Syria. The SOHR claims that Assad subsequently fled to Russia on his plane after facing opposition to the proposal.

=== Assad loyalist clashes ===
Between late November and early December 2024, several clashes took place between Assad loyalists and the forces of the Syrian caretaker government, primarily in Alawite-majority areas of Tartus and Latakia governorates, as well as in the western Hama and Homs governorates.

On 8 March 2025, the UK-based SOHR reported that Syrian security forces and pro-government fighters had committed a massacre of more than 740 Alawite civilians during clashes in western Syria in March 2025. There were reports that Alawites who had opposed the Assad regime in the past were also murdered in sectarian attacks.

After the clashes were suppressed, the SDF agreed to integrate into state institutions on 10 March 2025.

=== Proposed handover of Bashar al-Assad to Syria ===
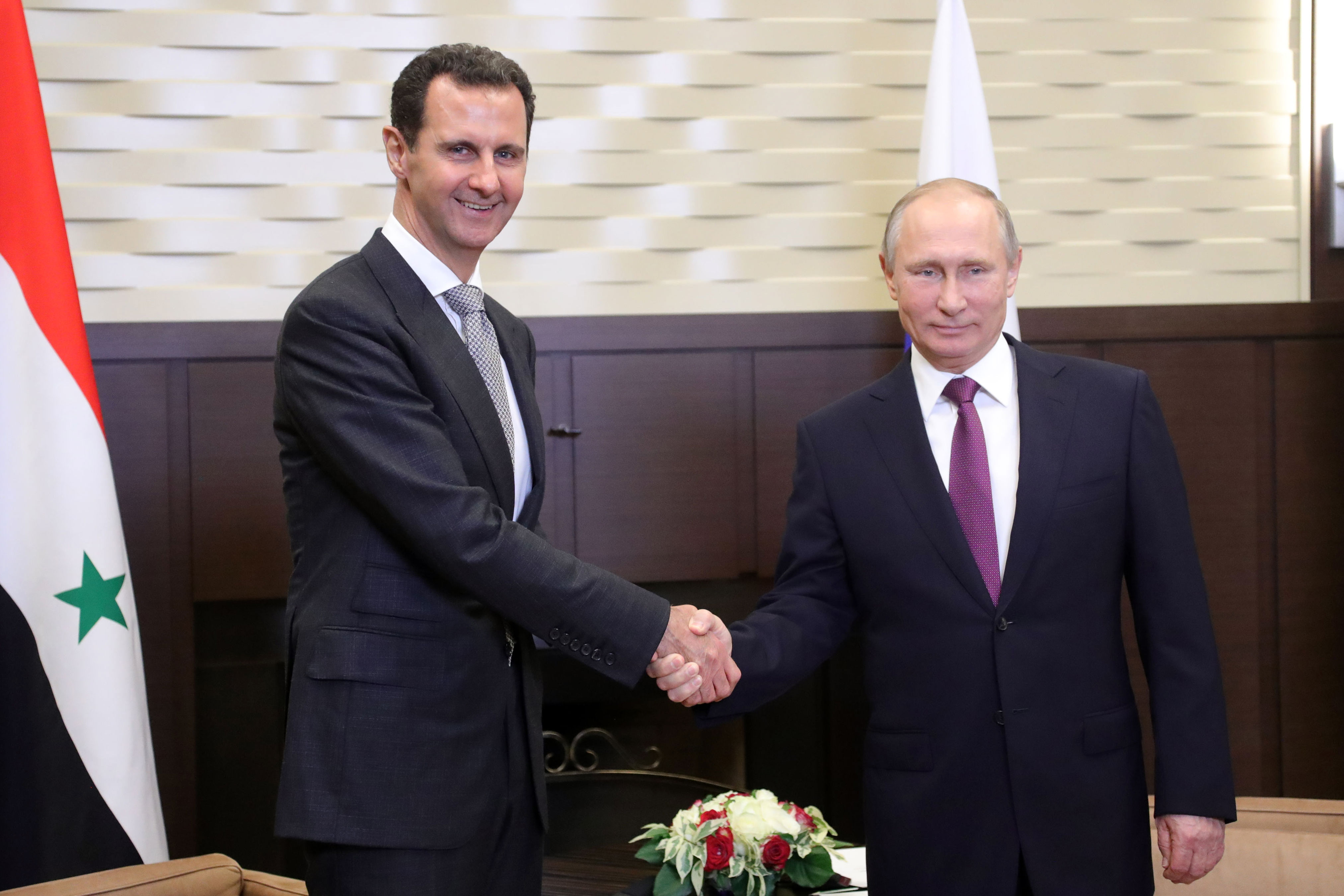
Bashar al-Assad with Vladimir Putin in 2017

Immediately following the fall of Damascus, advancing rebel forces dispatched scouting teams to locate and apprehend Assad, and announced a US$10 million reward for information leading to his capture.

The Syrian caretaker government, and later the transitional government, demanded his extradition so that he can be tried for crimes against humanity and potentially other charges stemming mainly from his violent crackdown on the Syrian revolution.

The first request for Russia to hand over Bashar al-Assad reportedly came in January 2025, during the first visit by a Russian delegation to Syria after the fall of the Assad regime. The request was allegedly made by then de facto leader Ahmed al-Sharaa, who later became president, to a Russian delegation led by Deputy Foreign Minister Mikhail Bogdanov. The Kremlin refused to comment on the matter. On 22 March 2025, Al Arabiya reported, citing unnamed sources, that al-Sharaa had asked Russian President Vladimir Putin to hand over Bashar al-Assad for trial in Syria.

On 7 April 2025, Russian Ambassador to Iraq Elbrus Kutrashev told the Islamic Republic News Agency that Assad's settlement in Moscow was conditional on his total withdrawal from media and political activities. He added that the asylum granted to Assad and his family had been personally ordered by Putin and would remain unchanged. In an interview with The New York Times in April 2025, al-Sharaa said that Syrian officials requested Russia to extradite Assad as a condition for allowing their military presence in Syria, but Russia refused.

On 15 October 2025, al-Sharaa visited Moscow, Russia, where he met with Russian President Vladimir Putin. According to Syrian officials, discussions during the visit were also expected to include a request for the handover of Assad. On 16 October 2025, Kremlin spokesperson Dmitry Peskov refused to comment on whether extraditing Assad was raised during talks, saying, “We have nothing to report on Assad here; we have nothing to report in this context.”

== Commemoration ==
In January 2025, during the Syrian Revolution Victory Conference, Hassan Abdul Ghani, the spokesman for the rebels' Military Operations Command, announced that 8 December, the date of the fall of the Assad regime, would be declared a national holiday. In October 2025, President Ahmed al-Sharaa issued a presidential decree officially designating the date of Assad’s fall as an annual holiday called "Liberation Day."

On 8 December 2025, the Syrian Post issued a set of commemorative postage stamps to mark Liberation Day.

== Analysis ==
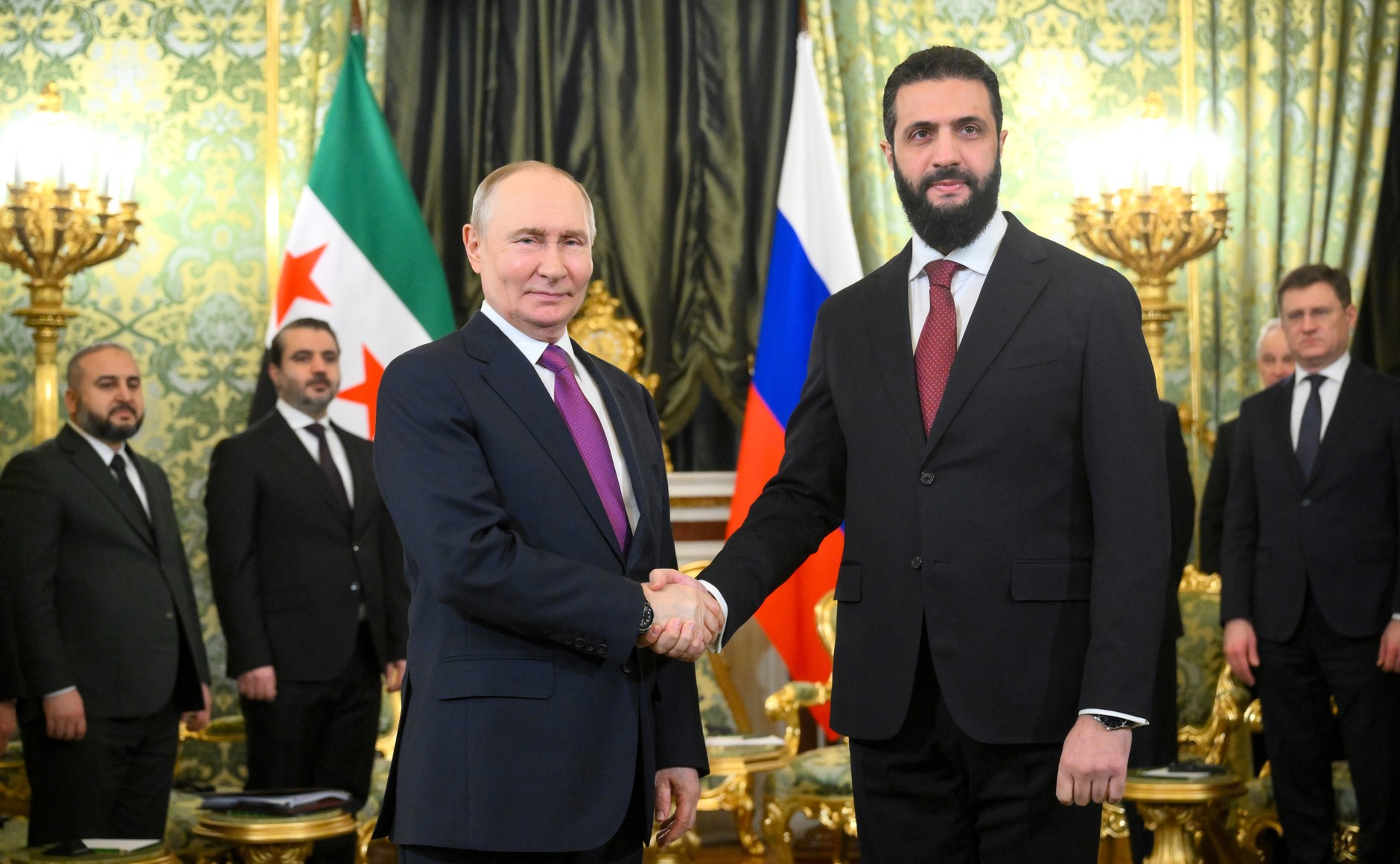
Syrian president Ahmed al-Sharaa with Vladimir Putin, 28 January 2026

Senior fellow Natasha Hall at the American think tank Center for Strategic and International Studies attributed the government's collapse to the weakening of Assad's traditional allies, with Russia focused on its war in Ukraine and Iran facing regional challenges. Additionally, she posited that Syria's severe economic conditions, with approximately 90 percent of the population living below the poverty line and many living in displacement camps, contributed to the erosion of government support.

Senior analyst Jerome Drevon from the International Crisis Group remarked that it would be "extremely challenging" for the Syrian opposition to decide on a new governing system in Syria given the diversity of the rebel coalition, noting that while "some groups are more structured, more organized," others are "more local entities."

Russian analysts and media generally blamed Assad for losing the war. Semyon Bagdasarov told Komsomolskaya Pravda that the Ba'athist regime failed to motivate its troops and to unite the various Syrian ethnic and religious group around its cause.

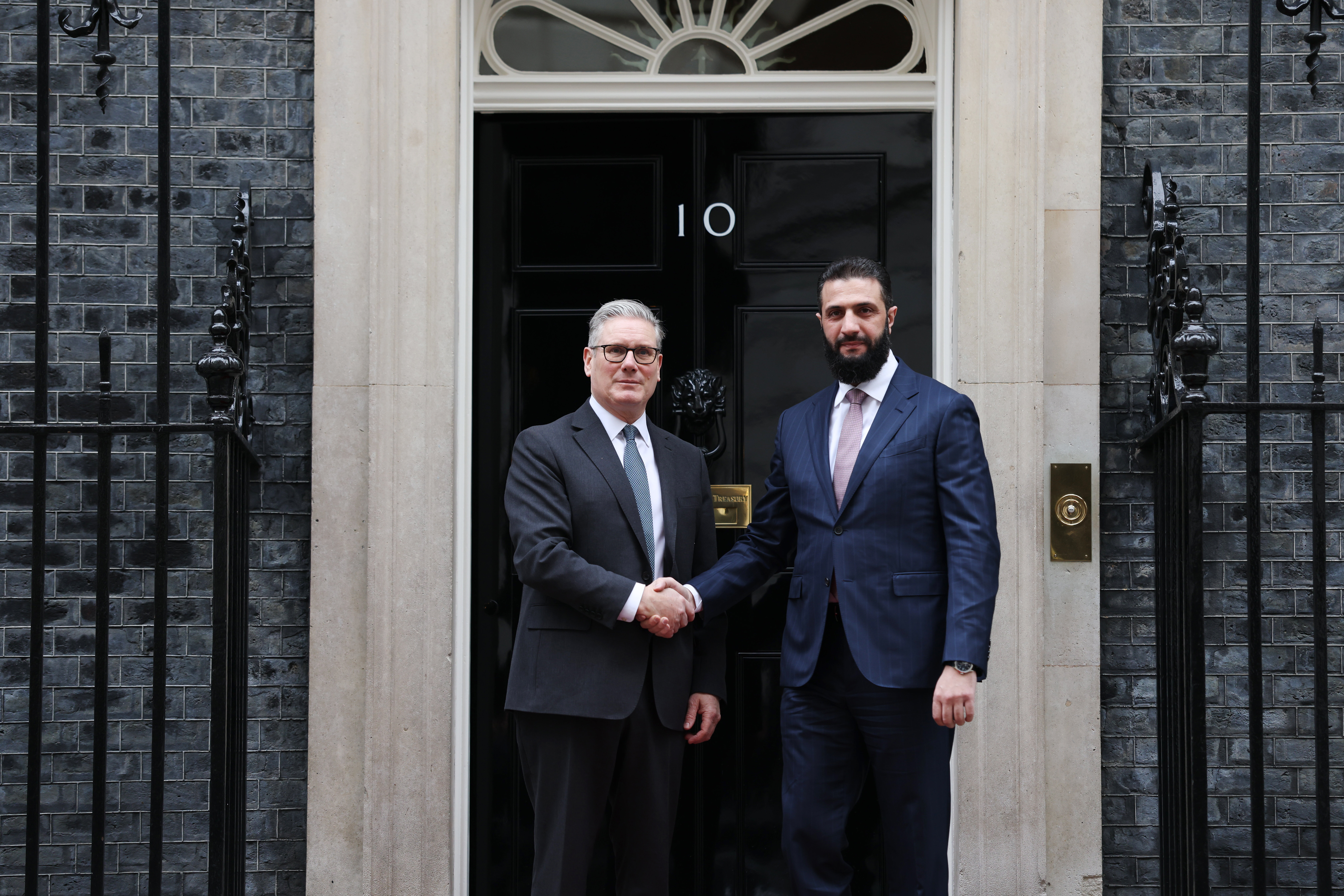
Syrian President Ahmed al-Sharaa with United Kingdom Prime Minister Keir Starmer, 31 March 2026

Similarly, political scientist Andrey Kortunov wrote that Assad had failed to unite Syrians and achieve national reconciliation, comparing him to former Afghan President Ashraf Ghani, who was overthrown by the Taliban in 2021. Journalist Vitaly Ryumshin shared this comparison, but partially defended the Syrian government, arguing that the lack of reform was due to economic sanctions on the country and loss of control over the oil resources to the United States and the Kurds.

In a different view, Anton Mardasov, a Russian expert on the Middle East, argued to Nezavisimaya Gazeta that Assad's failure was not due to Western sanctions but because of Al-Assad's failure to deal with the country's problems, specifically mentioning the economic crisis, endemic corruption and nepotism and "the loss of touch with reality and thinking in the paradigm of 50 years ago". Mardasov also told The New York Times that Russia's inability to assist Assad was due to its war with Ukraine.

Similarly, Bassam Haddad limits the importance attributed to international actors (mainly Turkey, the US, and Israel) in assisting HTS to topple the regime. According to Haddad, this perspective overlooks the decades of problems in Syria the regime either created itself or failed to address adequately. Haddad argues these to be equally important as the weakening of the Assad regime through US sanctions, Turkish support for the opposition, and Russia's and Iran's preoccupation with other conflicts.

International editor of Moskovskij Komsomolets Andrei Yashlavsky blamed the Syrian Arab Army for failing to resist and argued that the army's ineffectiveness made Russia's attempt to aid Assad futile. Russian military bloggers were particularly outraged by the fall of Syria, with some protesting against the Russian government and others blaming Assad. Writing for the Council on Foreign Relations, Steven A. Cook expressed concern about the future of Syria's state following Assad's downfall. Although the opposition led by Tahrir al-Sham (HTS) avoids extreme measures, it has a history of exercising brute force. Critics and opponents of the group's leader, Ahmed al-Sharaa (then known by his nom de guerre Abu Mohammad al-Jolani), highlighted reports of abuses in HTS-controlled prisons in rebel-held Idlib Governorate. According to Cook, the mixed record suggests that while HTS aims to present itself as a more moderate force, it continues to exercise repressive governance in areas they control.

Jamie Dettmer of Politico said whether or not Syrian citizens have benefitted remains to be observed as the country has to develop without violent forces. In Idlib Governorate, the HTS reduced their hostility towards the Christian and Druze communities. Upon gaining control of Aleppo, al-Sharaa ensured that the Christian population would be unharmed and church services proceeded without interruption. Al-Sharaa previously said in an interview on CNN that the HTS's main agenda was to redevelop Syria.

== Impact ==
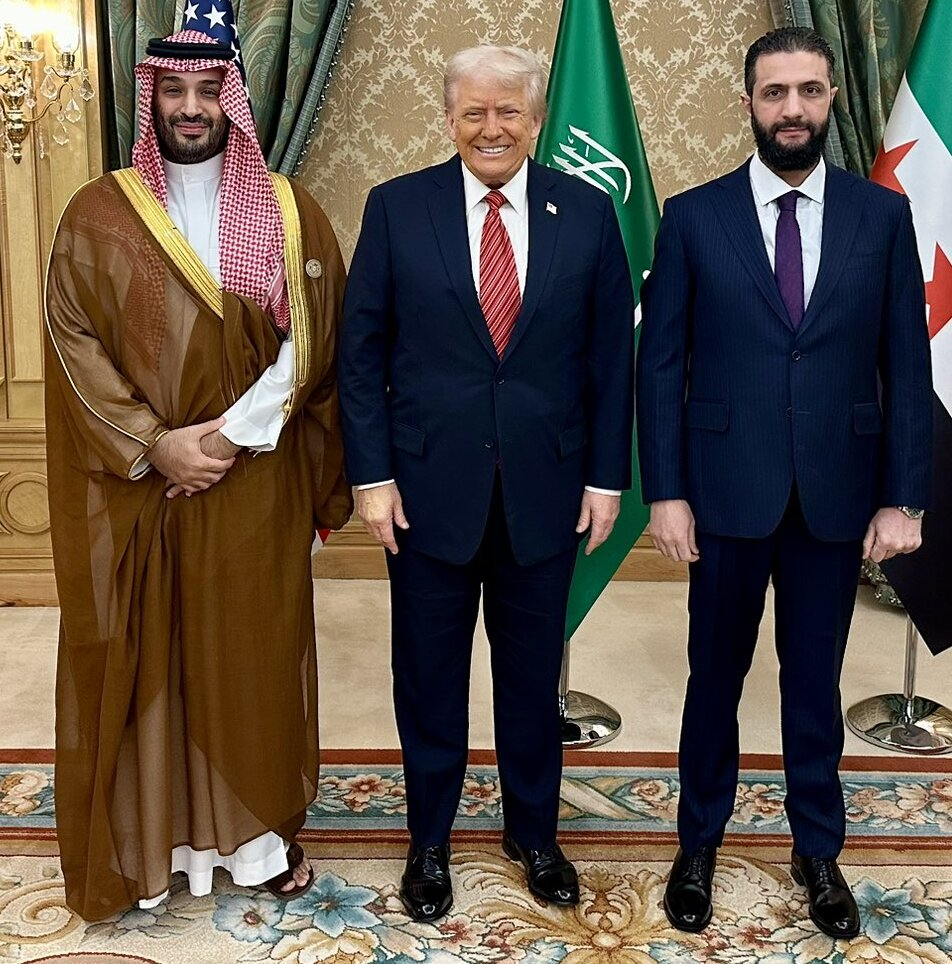
Syrian President Ahmed al-Sharaa with U.S. president Donald Trump and Crown Prince of Saudi Arabia Mohammed bin Salman in Riyadh, Saudi Arabia, 14 May 2025

The fall of Assad triggered a high-stakes geopolitical scramble as regional powers continued vying for influence in the fragmented country. Countries like Saudi Arabia, Egypt, the UAE, Turkey and Qatar pursued competing interests, with Egypt and the Gulf states seeking to prevent the rise of Islamist factions, particularly the Muslim Brotherhood, while Turkey and Qatar back groups sympathetic to these ideologies. Israel, aiming to preserve its security, favours Syria's fragmentation to prevent any dominant hostile force from emerging. The United States continues to support the Syrian Armed Forces under the transitional government led by President Ahmed al-Sharaa.

Assad's government was an important ally of Iran and a long-standing member of the Iranian-led Axis of Resistance. Following the rebel capture of Damascus, the Iranian embassy was ransacked, with portraits of Iran's leaders torn down and discarded. Iranian diplomats and Quds Force commanders left Syria in haste. Many Syrians reportedly held Iran and Hezbollah responsible for supporting Assad's oppressive rule. In late 2024, after the fall of the Assad regime, Israel intensified its bombing campaign in Syria, targeting Hezbollah positions and Syrian-Iranian military assets. The loss of Syria also disrupted Iran's supply routes to Hezbollah in Lebanon, weakening the group's arsenal and diminishing Iran's strategic foothold in the region. These developments, along with broader regional conflicts, further undermined the Iran-led Axis of Resistance.

Western media also described the fall of Assad as damaging to Russian foreign policy, as it exposed Putin's increasing inflexibility and struggle to keep Russia's allies in Africa (Mali, Burkina Faso and Niger) afloat in the midst of the Russo-Ukrainian war. Observers considered it probable that it would affect Putin's Ukraine strategy following the forced withdrawal of Russian forces from Syria, as well as his influence in Latin America and Africa.

Several Western journalists, academics and geo-political analysts compared the fall of the Assad regime to the fall of the Berlin Wall in 1989. Meysam Karim Jaffari, a journalist affiliated with Iran's Islamic Revolutionary Guard Corps, told reporters from The New York Times newspaper: "The Berlin Wall of unity for the Axis of Resistance has collapsed."

== See also ==
- Reactions to the fall of the Assad regime
- Fall of Saddam Hussein
- Fall of Nicolás Maduro
- Fall of Sheikh Hasina
- Fall of Suharto
- Fall of the Derg regime
- Fall of the Fascist regime in Italy
- Fall of Kampala
- 2021 Taliban offensive
- Fall of Saigon
