= Tartus (former People's Assembly electoral district) =

Former electoral district of Syria's national legislature

- Former electoral district for the People's Assembly
- Location of Tartus within Syria
- Governorate: Tartus
- Population: 797,000 (2011)
- Area: 1,892 km^{2}

Former electoral district
- Created: 1973
- Abolished: 2025
- Seats: List: 13 (1998–2025); 10 (1973–1990)
- Created from: List: Baniyas; Safita; Tartus
- Replaced by: List: Baniyas; Duraykish and al-Shaykh Badr; Safita; Tartus

Tartus (Arabic: طرطوس) was an electoral district used to elect members of the Syrian People's Assembly between 1973 and 2025.

== Electoral system ==
The electoral system used to elect the People's Assembly was introduced in 1973 and remained in use until the assembly's dissolution in 2025. Each governorate formed a single, large electoral district, except for Aleppo Governorate, which was divided into two districts: the city of Aleppo and the rural districts of Aleppo Governorate. Within each district, seats were awarded on a block-vote basis, with the candidates receiving the largest number of votes taking all of the seats allocated to it, and the assembly was composed of representatives of two sectors, "workers and peasants" and "other sectors of the people", with the former guaranteed at least half of its seats nationally. The number of seats, and their distribution among districts, was left to the president of the republic to set by decree rather than being fixed in law; the total was raised from 186 to 195 in 1981 and from 195 to 250 in 1990, after which the distribution among the fifteen electoral districts was not changed.

All Syrian citizens aged 18 and over were entitled to vote, other than those under legal guardianship, those with a mental illness affecting their legal capacity, and those convicted of a felony or a "dishonourable" misdemeanour, while serving members of the armed forces and police were barred from voting and from standing as candidates; candidates were further required to be at least 25 years old and to have held Syrian nationality for at least five years, a period raised to ten under the 2011 and 2014 electoral laws. During the 2011 reform of the electoral law, the replacement of this system was discussed because of its weak representativeness, but the large-district, block-vote system was retained; the reform instead moved the administration of elections from the Ministry of Interior and provincial governors to an independent Supreme Judicial Committee for Elections, a structure carried over into a further law passed in 2014 that consolidated the rules for presidential, parliamentary and local-council elections into a single statute.

Beyond being considered unrepresentative — a majoritarian, large-district system of a kind rejected by most electoral systems worldwide — the system has also been criticised for the unevenness of its distribution of seats between governorates. Based on the number of registered voters at the 2012 election, the average was around 59,000 voters per seat nationally, but the ratio varied considerably: about 37,800 voters per seat in Damascus and 51,500 in Tartus, compared with 71,700 in Al-Hasakah and 69,500 in the rural districts of Aleppo Governorate, with no mechanism beyond a presidential decree governing the size of constituencies or the allocation of seats between them.

== Members ==
| Elections | MPA (Party) | MPA (Party) | MPA (Party) | MPA (Party) | MPA (Party) | MPA (Party) | MPA (Party) | MPA (Party) | MPA (Party) | MPA (Party) | MPA (Party) | MPA (Party) | MPA (Party) |
|---|---|---|---|---|---|---|---|---|---|---|---|---|---|
| 1973 | Mahmoud Hasan (N/A) | Iskandar Ataki (N/A) | Issa Khaddour (N/A) | Ali Ahmad Ali (N/A) | Michel Isa Jurjus (N/A) | Ali al-Zaza (N/A) | Sarem Mahmoud Youssef (N/A) | Muharram Tayyara (N/A) | Ahmad Harfush (N/A) | Hanaa al-Hamwi (N/A) | 10 seats | | |
| 1977 | Muhammad Mayhoub (N/A) | Aziz Suleiman (N/A) | Issa Khaddour (N/A) | Marwan al-Hamwi (N/A) | Issa al-Khoury (N/A) | Muhsen Bilal (Ba'ath) | Sulafa Dib (N/A) | Muharram Tayyara (N/A) | Hamid al-Mahmoud (N/A) | Najm al-Din al-Saleh (N/A) | 10 seats | | |
| 1981 | Youssef Mardash (N/A) | Muhammad Hashim Ali (N/A) | Ali Salim Ibrahim (N/A) | Muhammad Ghassan Tayyara (N/A) | Muhammad Tawfiq Hassan (N/A) | Muhsen Bilal (Ba'ath) | Waheeb Salim Tannous (N/A) | Nawal al-Muhammad (N/A) | Muhammad Ghassan Othman (N/A) | Najm al-Din al-Saleh (N/A) | 10 seats | | |
| 1986 | Izz al-Din Nasser (N/A) | Sharif Hassan (N/A) | Youssef Youssef (N/A) | Muhammad Ghassan Tayyara (N/A) | Ahmad Hassan (Ba'ath) | Mahmoud Diyoub (N/A) | Mustafa Najm (N/A) | Nawal al-Muhammad (N/A) | Muhammad Zugheibi (N/A) | Najm al-Din al-Saleh (N/A) | 10 seats | | |
| 1990 | Izz al-Din Nasser (N/A) | Abd al-Latif Mahrez (N/A) | Nadim al-Kanj (N/A) | Muhammad Ghassan Tayyara (N/A) | Abd al-Munim Bayasi (N/A) | Yahya al-Khaddam (N/A) | Jamila Ali (N/A) | Suleiman Khaddour (N/A) | Muhammad Zugheibi (N/A) | Najm al-Din al-Saleh (N/A) | Nazih Bashour (N/A) | Ali Dawoud (N/A) | Mohsen Imran (N/A) |
| 1994 | Suleiman Muhammad (N/A) | Amal Mardash (N/A) | Nadim al-Kanj (N/A) | Muhammad Ghassan Tayyara (N/A) | Abdallah Hussein (N/A) | Yahya al-Khaddam (N/A) | Kharfan al-Heifi (N/A) | Ramadan Atiya (N/A) | Muhammad Saleh (N/A) | Najm al-Din al-Saleh (N/A) | Nazih Bashour (N/A) | Mahmoud Ali Youssef (N/A) | N/A |
| 1995 by-election | Suleiman Muhammad (N/A) | Amal Mardash (N/A) | Nadim al-Kanj (N/A) | Muhammad Ghassan Tayyara (N/A) | Abdallah Hussein (N/A) | Mikhail Hajjar (N/A) | Kharfan al-Heifi (N/A) | Ramadan Atiya (N/A) | Wajih al-Sheikh (N/A) | Najm al-Din al-Saleh (N/A) | Nazih Bashour (N/A) | Mahmoud Ali Youssef (N/A) | N/A |
| 1998 | Muhammad Mayhoub (N/A) | Nasr Mahrez (N/A) | Mahmoud Afif (N/A) | Waad Khaddam (N/A) | Inam Abbas (N/A) | Suhail Zidan (N/A) | Imad al-Din Suleiman (N/A) | Ramadan Atiya (N/A) | Wajih al-Sheikh (N/A) | Abboud Abboud (N/A) | Ahmad Azil (N/A) | Muhammad Suleiman (Ba'ath) | Mohsen Imran (N/A) |
| 2003 | Hisham Tayyara (N/A) | Ibrahim Suleiman (Ba'ath) | Riham Bashour (N/A) | Waad Khaddam (N/A) | Inam Abbas (N/A) | Izz al-Din Imran (N/A) | Najah Younes (N/A) | Ramadan Atiya (N/A) | Ahmad Ghazil (N/A) | Wajih Hashem (N/A) | George Jabbour (N/A) | Muhammad Suleiman (Ba'ath) | Khadr Hussein (Ind.) |
| 2007 | Ali Ali (Ba'ath) | Ibrahim Suleiman (Ba'ath) | Fahima Arous (Ba'ath) | Abd al-Karim Mustafa (Ba'ath) | Rami Saleh (Ba'ath) | Numan Hamoud (Ind.) | Imran Imran al-Zawi (Ba'ath) | Bassam Dakrouj (Ba'ath) | Mona al-Dayaa (Ba'ath) | Mai Issa (SUP) | Jamal Akrah (SUP) | Ahmad Fahl (Ind.) | Khadr Hussein (Ind.) |
| 2012 | Basil Issa (Ba'ath) | Sameer Jawhara (Ba'ath) | Sabah Ahmed (Ba'ath) | Muhammad Wahoud (Ba'ath) | Rami Saleh (Ba'ath) | Maha al-Omar (Ba'ath) | Suhail Khadr (Ind.) | Ali Nedda (Ind.) | Tony Hanna (Ba'ath) | Issam Khalil (Ba'ath) | Youssef Asaad (Ba'ath) | Mahmoud Bilal (Ind.) | Khadr Hussein (Ind.) |
| 2015 by-election | Basil Issa (Ba'ath) | Bassem Ahmad (Ba'ath) | Sabah Ahmed (Ba'ath) | Muhammad Wahoud (Ba'ath) | Rami Saleh (Ba'ath) | Maha al-Omar (Ba'ath) | Suhail Khadr (Ind.) | Ali Nedda (Ind.) | Tony Hanna (Ba'ath) | Issam Khalil (Ba'ath) | Youssef Asaad (Ba'ath) | Mahmoud Bilal (Ind.) | Khadr Hussein (Ind.) |
| 2016 | Basil Issa (Ba'ath) | Khaled Khaddouj (Ba'ath) | Dima Suleiman (Ba'ath) | Noura Hassan (Ba'ath) | Rami Saleh (Ba'ath) | Ashwaq Abbas (Ind.) | Enas al-Malouhi (SSNP) | Ayman Bilal (Ba'ath) | Tony Hanna (Ba'ath) | Khair al-Din al-Sayyid (Ba'ath) | Saer Ibrahim (Ba'ath) | Nasser Suleiman (Ba'ath) | Khadr Hussein (Ind.) |
| 2018 by-election | Basil Issa (Ba'ath) | Khaled Khaddouj (Ba'ath) | Dima Suleiman (Ba'ath) | Noura Hassan (Ba'ath) | Rami Saleh (Ba'ath) | Ashwaq Abbas (Ind.) | Enas al-Malouhi (SSNP) | Ayman Bilal (Ba'ath) | Tony Hanna (Ba'ath) | Khair al-Din al-Sayyid (Ba'ath) | Qutaiba Badr (Ba'ath) | Nasser Suleiman (Ba'ath) | Khadr Hussein (Ind.) |
| 2020 | Siham al-Othman (Ba'ath) | Ahmad Ali Hasan (Ba'ath) | Abbas Izz al-Din Abbas (Ba'ath) | Muhammad Jari (Ba'ath) | Rami Saleh (Ba'ath) | Rania Hassan (Ba'ath) | Suhail Khadr (Ind.) | Ayman Bilal (Ba'ath) | Tony Hanna (Ba'ath) | Nasr Hassan (Ba'ath) | Akram Abd al-Jalil (Ba'ath) | Maan Muhammad (DSUP) | Mahmoud Bilal (Ind.) |
| 2024 | Siham al-Othman (Ba'ath) | Bassel Issa (Ba'ath) | Modar al-Aji (Ba'ath) | Younes Hamdoush (Ba'ath) | Ahmad Ali (Ba'ath) | Alaa Muhammad (Ind.) | Qutaiba Badr (Ba'ath) | Fadi Abbas (Ba'ath) | Tony Hanna (Ba'ath) | Ahmad Fahl (Ba'ath) | Bayan Othman (Ba'ath) | Mahmoud Afif (SCP-U) | Sanan Dargam (Ind.) |
| 2024 by-election | Siham al-Othman (Ba'ath) | Bassel Issa (Ba'ath) | Modar al-Aji (Ba'ath) | Younes Hamdoush (Ba'ath) | Ahmad Ali (Ba'ath) | Alaa Muhammad (Ind.) | Qutaiba Badr (Ba'ath) | Fadi Abbas (Ba'ath) | Vacant (Note: By-elections were cancelled. See 2024 by-election.) | Ahmad Fahl (Ba'ath) | Bayan Othman (Ba'ath) | Mahmoud Afif (SCP-U) | Sanan Dargam (Ind.) |
