= Lina Aizouqi =

Syrian politician

Member of the People's Assembly
- Incumbent
- Assumed office 6 October 2025
- Constituency: Duraykish and Al-Shaykh Badr

Personal details
- Born: 1984 (age 41–42) Tartus, Syria
- Party: Independent
- Education: University of Tartus (PhD)
- Occupation: Politician

Lina Fahim Aizouqi (born 1984) is a Syrian politician currently serving as a member of the People's Assembly, representing the constituencies of Duraykish and Al-Shaykh Badr. She is one of six women elected in the 2025 Syrian parliamentary election.

She is a member of the Ismaili Muslim community, and has a PhD in Economics for which she lectures at the University of Tartus. One of her policy goals is to ensure local police forces are drawn from the local population instead of being sent in by the central government in Damascus.
