= Khirbet al-Ma'zah =

Town in northwestern Syria

Khirbet al-Ma'zah خربة المعزة
- Town
- Location in Syria
- Coordinates: 34°47′59″N 36°0′16″E
- Country: Syria
- Governorate: Tartus
- District: Tartus
- Subdistrict: Khirbet al-Ma'zah

Population (2004)
  - Total: 4,798

Khirbet al-Ma'zah (Arabic: خربة المعزة) is a town in western Syria, administratively part of the Tartus Governorate. It is located along the road between Safita in the east and Tartus to the west. According to the Syria Central Bureau of Statistics (CBS), Khirbet al-Ma'zah had a population of 4,798 in the 2004 census. It is the administrative center of the Khirbet al-Ma'zah Subdistrict (nahiyah) which consisted of 11 localities with a collective population of 22,897. The inhabitants of the town and the subdistrict are predominantly Alawites, mainly from the Kalbiyya tribal confederation.

== Incidents ==
On December 26, 2024, former Syrian major general Mohammad Kanjo Hassan was found hiding in a hole in Khirbet al-Ma'zah, he was arrested along with 20 of his loyalists.

== Sources ==
- Balanche, Fabrice (2000). "Les Alaouites, l'espace et le pouvoir dans la région côtière syrienne : une intégration nationale ambiguë" (in French). Tours: Université François Rabelais.
