= Mohammad Kanjo Hassan =

Syrian military judge (born c. 1957)

Mohammed Kanjo Hassan
- محمد كنجو الحسن

Personal details
- Born: c. 1957 Duraykish District, Second Syrian Republic
- Known for: Mastermind of Sednaya prison torture and abuse
- Military career
- Allegiance: Ba'athist Syria
- Branch: Syrian Arab Armed Forces
- Service years: ?–2024
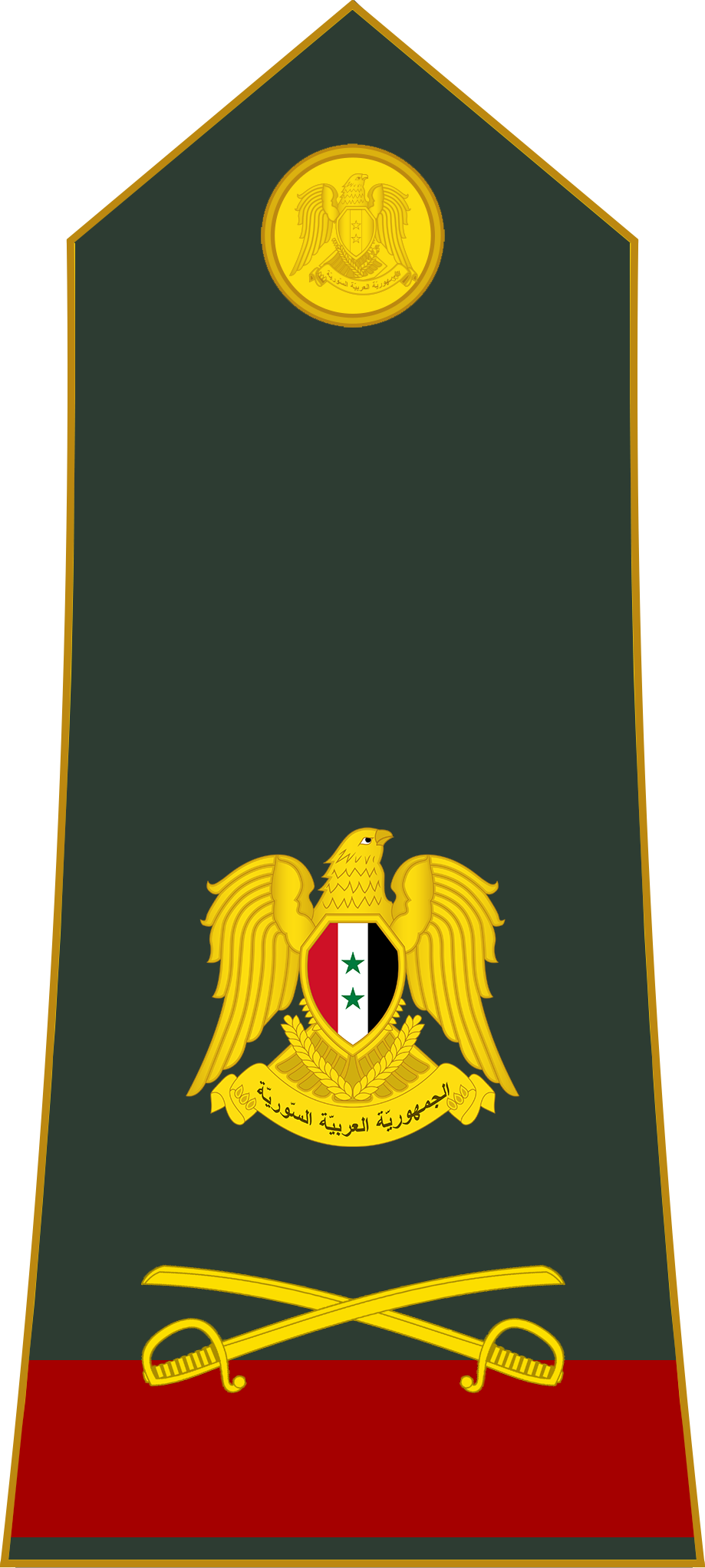
- Rank: Major General
- Nickname: Butcher of Sednaya
- Conflicts: Syrian civil war

Mohammed Kanjo Hassan (Arabic: محمد كنجو الحسن; born c. 1957) is a Syrian former major general who served as head of Syria's military field court and chief of military justice across Syria.

Kanjo Hassan would sentence people to Sednaya Prison, earning him the nickname "the Butcher of Sednaya". On 26 December 2024, Kanjo Hassan was arrested by the Military Operations Command after a gunfight between Syrian security forces and Kanjo Hassan loyalists.

== Early life ==
Mohammad Kanjo Hassan was born in the Duraykish District in Tartus. After graduating from law school, Hassan enrolled in the Syrian Arab Armed Forces where he joined the military judiciary, climbing the ranks until he was appointed as prosecutor for the military field court.

== Role during the Assad regime ==
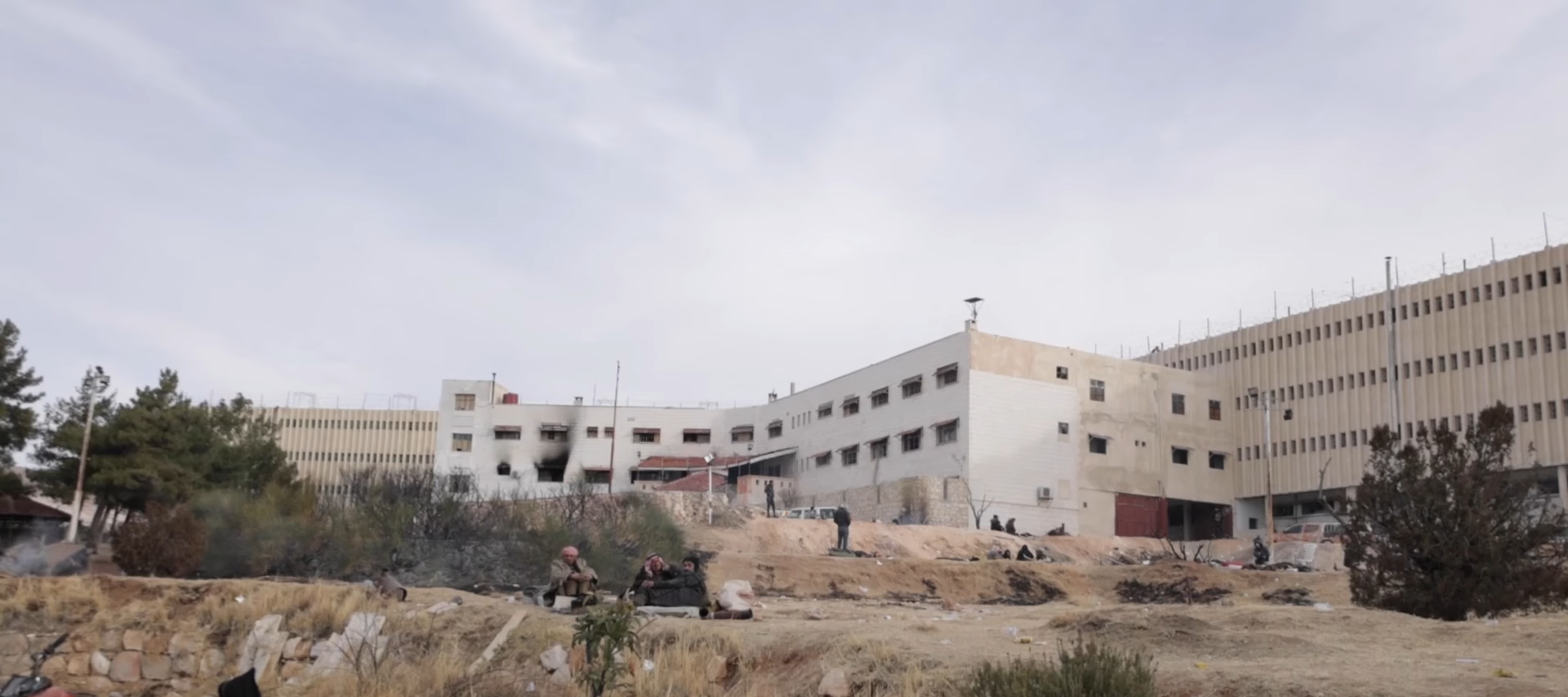
Sednaya prison in 2024

Kanjo Hassan was the head of Syria's military field court from 2011 to 2014. Later on, Kanjo Hassan was promoted to chief of military justice across Syria, During his tenure in the military field court, Kanjo Hassan was accused of extorting detainees' families in order to obtain money from them, amassing $150 million from bribes paid by relatives of detainees desperate for information on their loved ones.

During his role as prosecutor for the military courts, Kanjo Hassan was responsible for issuing various death sentences, life sentences and prolonged prison sentences.

Kanjo Hassan would amend charges set out against the defendants following the issuance of a presidential amnesty, so that the amnesty would not apply to them which led the mass trial of 116 defendants who were arrested during the siege of Daraa.

According to the victims, the trials would usually last three minutes, during which the detainee is not permitted to speak and there are no rights to representation from legal counsel. Kanjo Hassan carried out his role as prosecutor until his promotion to the rank of major-general, becoming head of the court.

After the fall of the Assad regime, Kanjo Hassan would go into hiding as he became the most wanted fugitive in Syria after members of the Assad family. He helped lead the Ba'athist insurgency in western Syria.

== Manhunt and capture ==
Capture of Mohammed Kanjo Hassan
- Part of the Syrian civil war and Western Syria clashes (December 2024–present)
- Location: Khirbet al-Ma'zah, Syria
- Commanded by: (Syrian opposition) Military Operations Command
- Target: (Syria) Mohammad Kanjo Hassan (POW)
- Date: 26 December 2024; 22 months ago
- Outcome: Operational success: Capture and arrest of Mohammad Kanjo Hassan and twenty others.
- Casualties: 14 (+3 attackers) killed 10 injured

On 25 December, unidentified armed groups conducted synchronized assaults on multiple security checkpoints in the western Hama countryside with RPG launchers and heavy machine guns, killing one Syrian government troop and injuring another. On the same day, a contingent of the General Security Forces –a police unit loyal to the new government– made their way to the Khirbet al-Ma'zah village in the southern Tartus Governorate. They intended to arrest Kanjo Hassan. Upon entering the village, the General Security Forces were ambushed by militants, with 14 policemen and three attackers being killed. According to SOHR, loyalists of Kanjo Hassan and another former Ba'athist officer, Suhayl al-Hasan, were responsible for the ambush. The militants were led by Mohammed Kanjo Hassan's brother and expelled the security forces from the village. The transitional government described the ambush as an attack by Assad loyalists. A curfew was declared at several cities.

The next day, the Military Operations Command conducted a major security operation combing through several Tartus Governorate villages and forests for regime loyalists and those involved with Assad regime-related crimes. Armed forces launched a raid in the village of Khirbet al-Ma'zah, resulting in the arrest of Kanjo Hassan and twenty of his associates. Kanjo Hassan was found hiding in a hole in the ground. The conflict resulted in fourteen interior ministry personnel being killed and ten others sustaining injuries during what officials described as an "ambush". Three gunmen associated with Kanjo Hassan were also killed in the gunfight. Following his capture, footage published by al-Marsid showed Kanjo lying the ground with visible facial injuries surrounded by bottles, suggesting he had been subjected to physical abuse by his captors.

The news of Kanjo Hassan's detention was confirmed by the Syrian Observatory for Human Rights. The National Coalition of Syrian Revolutionary and Opposition Forces welcomed the arrest, describing it as an "important step on the path to justice and the prosecution of those who committed crimes against the Syrian people".

== Aftermath ==
The military coalition "Radd al-ʿUdwan" (Deterring the Aggression Operations Room) has said that Kanjo Hassan "will be tried publicly in front of the Syrian people."
