= Amjad Ali =

Amjad Ali may refer to:

- Amjad Ali (Fijian politician), Fiji Indian politician
- Amjad Ali (cricketer) (born 1979), United Arab Emirates cricketer
- Amjad Ali (civil servant) (1907–1997), Pakistani civil servant
- Amjad Ali (Pakistani politician) (born 1973), Pakistani politician
- Amjad Ali (Assam politician) (1903–?), Indian parliament member
- Amjad Ali Khan (politician) (born 1972), Pakistani politician

== See also ==
- Nawab Ali Amjad Khan (1871–1905), Bengali politician
- Amjad Ali Aazmi (1882–1948), grand mufti of India
- Amjad Ali Khan (born 1945), Indian musician
- Amjad Ali Khan (Indian vocalist)
- Amjad Ali Rana, victim in the 2004 Ishrat Jahan encounter killing
- Amjad Ali Shah, nawab of Awadh
