= Steven A. Cook =

American foreign policy analyst

Steven A. Cook is the Eni Enrico Mattei senior fellow for Middle East and Africa studies at the Council on Foreign Relations (CFR). He is the author of False Dawn: Protest, Democracy, and Violence in the New Middle East (Oxford University Press, 2017). He is also the author of The Struggle for Egypt: From Nasser to Tahrir Square (Oxford University Press, 2011) and Ruling But Not Governing: The Military and Political Development in Egypt, Algeria, and Turkey (Johns Hopkins University Press, 2007). Cook contributes regularly to foreign policy journals such as Foreign Affairs, Foreign Policy, The Atlantic, and The New Republic. He also runs a blog about Middle Eastern politics and history.

== Academic background and honors ==
Cook received his undergraduate degree in international studies from Vassar College in 1990, a master's in international affairs from the Paul H. Nitze School of Advanced International Studies at Johns Hopkins University in 1995, and a PhD in political science from the University of Pennsylvania in 2003. Prior to joining CFR, Cook held fellowships at the Brookings Institution (2001–2002) and the Institute of Turkish Studies Research and Writing Fellowship (2001–2002). In 1999, he was a recipient of the Boren Fellowship to Turkey and Egypt.

== Experience ==
Cook travels to the Middle East, usually Turkey and Egypt, several times a year and has lived in Cairo, Damascus, Jerusalem, Ankara, and Ramallah. He knows three languages: English, Arabic, and Turkish. His research is primarily steeped in civil-military relations in the Middle East and he appears frequently on television and radio interviews to provide expert commentary on unfolding current events in the Middle East.

== Published works ==
Books

- False Dawn: Protest, Democracy, and Violence in the New Middle East 2017
- The Struggle for Egypt: From Nasser to Tahrir Square Fall 2011
- Ruling But Not Governing: The Military and Political Development in Egypt, Algeria, and Turkey 2007

Op-eds

- Tarnished Brass, Foreign Policy, August 2, 2011
- America's Radical Idealists Strike Again, The American Interest, July, 2011
- Arab Spring, Turkish Fall Foreign Policy, May 5, 2011
- After The Arab Spring, The Atlantic, March 28, 2011
- America Shouldn't Hijack Egypt's Revolution, Foreign Policy, March 9, 2011
- The Golan Heights Should Stay Israeli Forever, Foreign Policy, January 16, 2019

Articles

- The U.S.-Egyptian Break Up, Foreign Affairs, February 2, 2011
- Egypt's Hero?, Foreign Affairs, March 26, 2010
- The Third Intifada, The New Republic, November 16, 2009
- Adrift on the Nile, Foreign Affairs, March/April 2009

Interviews

- More Isolated al-Qaeda In The Mideast, Council on Foreign Relations, May 2, 2011
- Egypt's Referendum: Nervous Steps Forward, Council on Foreign Relations, March 21, 2011
- U.S.-Israeli Relations: Where Do They Go From Here?, PBS NewsHour, March 25, 2010
- Tentative Talks Resume In The Mideast, Worldfocus, March 9, 2010
- Hosni Mubarak Meets with President Obama, Charlie Rose (TV series), August 18, 2009
- July 2006 War Between Lebanon And Israel, Good Morning America, Summer 2006
