= Duraykish District =

Duraykish District منطقة دريكيش
- District
- Map of Duraykish District within Tartus Governorate
- Coordinates (Duraykish): 34.8969°N 36.1347°E
- Country: Syria
- Governorate: Tartus
- Seat: Duraykish
- Subdistricts: 4 nawāḥī

Area
  - Total: 185.87 km^{2} (71.76 sq mi)

Population (2004)
  - Total: 60,978
  - Density: 328.07/km^{2} (849.69/sq mi)
- Geocode: SY1004

Duraykish District (Arabic: منطقة دريكيش, romanized: manṭiqat Dreikiche) is a district of the Tartus Governorate in northwestern Syria. Administrative centre is the town of Duraykish. At the 2004 census, the district had a population of 60,978.

== Sub-districts ==
The district of Duraykish (Dreikiche) is divided into four sub-districts or nawāḥī (population as of 2004):

- Duraykish Subdistrict (ناحية دريكيش): population 28,749.
- Junaynet Ruslan Subdistrict (ناحية جنينة رسلان): population 9,846
- Hamin Subdistrict (ناحية حمين): population 8,679.
- Dweir Ruslan Subdistrict (ناحية دوير رسلان): population 13,704.

== Notable people ==
- Mohammad Kanjo Hassan
