= Bimalkah =

Bimalkah بملكة Bmalkyeh
- Village
- Location within Syria
- Coordinates: 34°56′5″N 35°58′22″E
- Country: Syria
- Governorate: Tartus
- District: Tartus
- Subdistrict: Tartus

Population (2004)
  - Total: 817
- Time zone: UTC+2 (EET)
  - Summer (DST): UTC+3 (EEST)

Bimalkah (Arabic: بملكة, also spelled Bmalkyeh) is a village and suburb in northwestern Syria, administratively part of the Tartus Governorate, located 10 kilometers northeast of Tartus. Nearby localities include Dweir al-Shaykh Saad to the west, al-Shaykh Saad and al-Khreibat to the southwest, Tayshur to the southeast, al-Baqaa and Hamin to the east, Khawabi and Khirbet al-Faras to the northeast, Awaru and al-Sawda to the north and Husayn al-Baher to the northwest.

According to the Syria Central Bureau of Statistics, Bimalkah had a population of 817 in the 2004 census. The inhabitants of the village are predominantly Christians of the Greek Orthodox Church or members of the Alawite community. Many of Tartus's wealthy Sunni Muslim families build their villas in Bimalkah as well. Together, Bimalkah, al-Khreibat and Dweir Taha (part of al-Sawda municipality) make up the Christian suburbs of Tartus.

During the Ottoman and French Mandate eras, the Christian residents of Bimalkah and al-Khraibet were one of the few peasant peoples of the coastal region to actually own their olive orchards unlike most other peasant communities whose lands were owned by landlords from the major coastal cities.
