= Zamrin =

Zamrin بحوزى
- Village
- Location in Syria
- Coordinates: 34°59′56″N 35°56′11″E
- Country: Syria
- Governorate: Tartus
- District: Tartus
- Subdistrict: Sawda

Population 2004
  - Total: 2,132

Zamrin (also spelled Zamreen) is a village in northwestern Syria, administratively part of the Tartus Governorate. It is situated near the Mediterranean coast. Nearby localities include Maten al-Sahel to the west, al-Sawda and Baashtar to the south, and al-Annazah to the northeast. Zamrin forms part of the al-Sawda municipality.

According to the Syria Central Bureau of Statistics (CBS), al-Sawda had a population of 4,064 in the 2004 census, of which 2,132 were residents of Zamrin. Its inhabitants are predominantly Sunni Muslims, while al-Sawda village is predominantly Greek Orthodox (Awaru is mostly Ismaili and Baashtar is mostly Alawite).

== History ==
In 1970, Zamrin became a part of the municipality of al-Sawda, along with al-Sawda and other nearby villages. Despite being the largest village in the municipality, constituting half of the population, representatives from Zamrin hold two seats in the ten-member municipal council. The village has not been able to gain independent municipal status from al-Sawda like Husayn al-Baher and Maten al-Sahel. In contrast to al-Sawda and Awaru, Zamrin lacks sidewalks, paved roads, street lights and sewer connection. Zamrin's political insignificance is largely attributed to the weak presence of the ruling Ba'ath Party in the village and the consequent difficulty to influence the relevant authorities.
