= Husayn al-Baher =

Husayn al-Baher حصين البحر
- Village
- Location within Syria
- Coordinates: 34°58′56″N 35°54′17″E
- Country: Syria
- Governorate: Tartus
- District: Tartus
- Subdistrict: Al-Sawda

Population (2004)
  - Total: 4,350
- Time zone: UTC+3 (AST)

Husayn al-Baher (Arabic: حصين البحر, also spelled Husain al-Bahr or Hussein al-Baher) is a village in northwestern Syria, administratively part of the Tartus Governorate, located north of Tartus. Nearby localities include Maten al-Sahel to the north, Annazah to the northeast, al-Sawda to the east, Awaru and Khirbet al-Faras to the southeast and Dweir al-Shaykh Saad to the south. According to the Syria Central Bureau of Statistics, Husayn al-Baher had a population of 4,350 in the 2004 census, making it the largest locality of the al-Sawda nahiyah ("sub-district"). The inhabitants of the village are predominantly Alawites, along with a Christian minority.

In 1970 the village became part of the newly established municipality of al-Sawda along with the mostly Alawite villages of Maten al-Sahel, Mazra'a, Mazra'a Shamamis, Bayt Jadid, the Sunni Muslim village of Zamrin, the Christian villages of al-Sawda and Bashtar, and the Ismaili village of Awaru. However, in 1985 Husayn al-Baher became a separate municipality due to its size and the good relations between the village residents, many of whom are members of the ruling Ba'ath Party, and the authorities. Husayn al-Baher is the birthplace of the Syrian writer Haidar Haidar and playwright Saadallah Wannous.
