= Awaru =

Awaru Uru
- Hamlet
- Location within Syria
- Coordinates: 34°57′44″N 35°57′23″E
- Country: Syria
- Governorate: Tartus
- District: Tartus
- Subdistrict: Al-Sawda
- Time zone: UTC+2 (EET)
  - Summer (DST): UTC+3 (EEST)

Awaru (Arabic: عورو; also spelled Uru) is a hamlet in northwestern Syria, administratively part of the al-Sawda municipality of the Tartus Governorate, located northeast of Tartus. Nearby localities include al-Sawda to the north, Khawabi to the east, Khirbet al-Faras to the southeast, Bimalkah to the south, Dweir al-Shaykh Saad to the southwest and Husayn al-Baher to the northwest.

The inhabitants of Awaru are Ismailis. The hamlet was annexed to the al-Sawda municipality in 1971. It is currently apportioned one seat in the municipality's council of 10 elected representatives.

== See also ==
- al-Qadmus
- Masyaf
