= Al-Khreibat =

Al-Khreibat الخريبات Kharibat Khuraybat
- Village
- Location within Syria
- Coordinates: 34°53′24″N 35°56′8″E
- Country: Syria
- Governorate: Tartus
- District: Tartus
- Subdistrict: Tartus

Population (2004)
  - Total: 1,464
- Time zone: UTC+2 (EET)
  - Summer (DST): UTC+3 (EEST)

Al-Khreibat (Arabic: الخريبات, also spelled Kharibat or Khuraybat) is a village and suburb in northwestern Syria, administratively part of the Tartus Governorate, located southeast of Tartus. Nearby localities include Beit Kammun to the south, Dibbash to the southeast, Tayshur to the east, and al-Shaykh Saad to the north.

== Population ==
According to the Syria Central Bureau of Statistics, al-Khreibat had a population of 1,464 in the 2004 census. The inhabitants of the village are predominantly Maronite Christians, although there is also an Alawite minority. Together, al-Khreibat, Bimalkah, and Dweir Taha (part of al-Sawda municipality) make up the Christian suburbs of Tartus. The population grows at a steady rate, although substantially lower than the surrounding Alawite and Sunni Muslim villages. This is due to low birth rates and high levels of emigration to the cities, such as Damascus and Aleppo and abroad to places like Lebanon, France, the United States and Canada.

During the Ottoman Empire and French Mandate eras, the Christian residents of al-Khreibat and Bimalkah were one of the few peoples of the coastal region to actually own their olive orchards unlike most other communities whose lands were owned by landlords from the major coastal cities.

The major family in this area is the Lahoud family, a Catholic Maronite group that has helped build the local church. They have also been involved in the olive oil and coffee business. They currently perform business in the United States.
