= Bahuzi =

Bahuzi بحوزي
- Village
- Location in Syria
- Coordinates: 34°45′17″N 36°0′55″E
- Country: Syria
- Governorate: Tartus
- District: Tartus
- Subdistrict: Al-Safsafah

Population 2004 census
  - Total: 1,801

Bahuzi (Arabic: بحوزي, also spelled Bhozy) is a village in northwestern Syria, administratively part of the Tartus Governorate. It is located between Safita (to the east) and Ras al-Khashufah (to the west). According to the Syria Central Bureau of Statistics (CBS), Bahuzi had a population of 1,801 in the 2004 census. Its inhabitants are predominantly Alawites.
