= Sibbeh =

Town in northwestern Syria

Sibbeh بلدة سبة Sebbeh
- Town
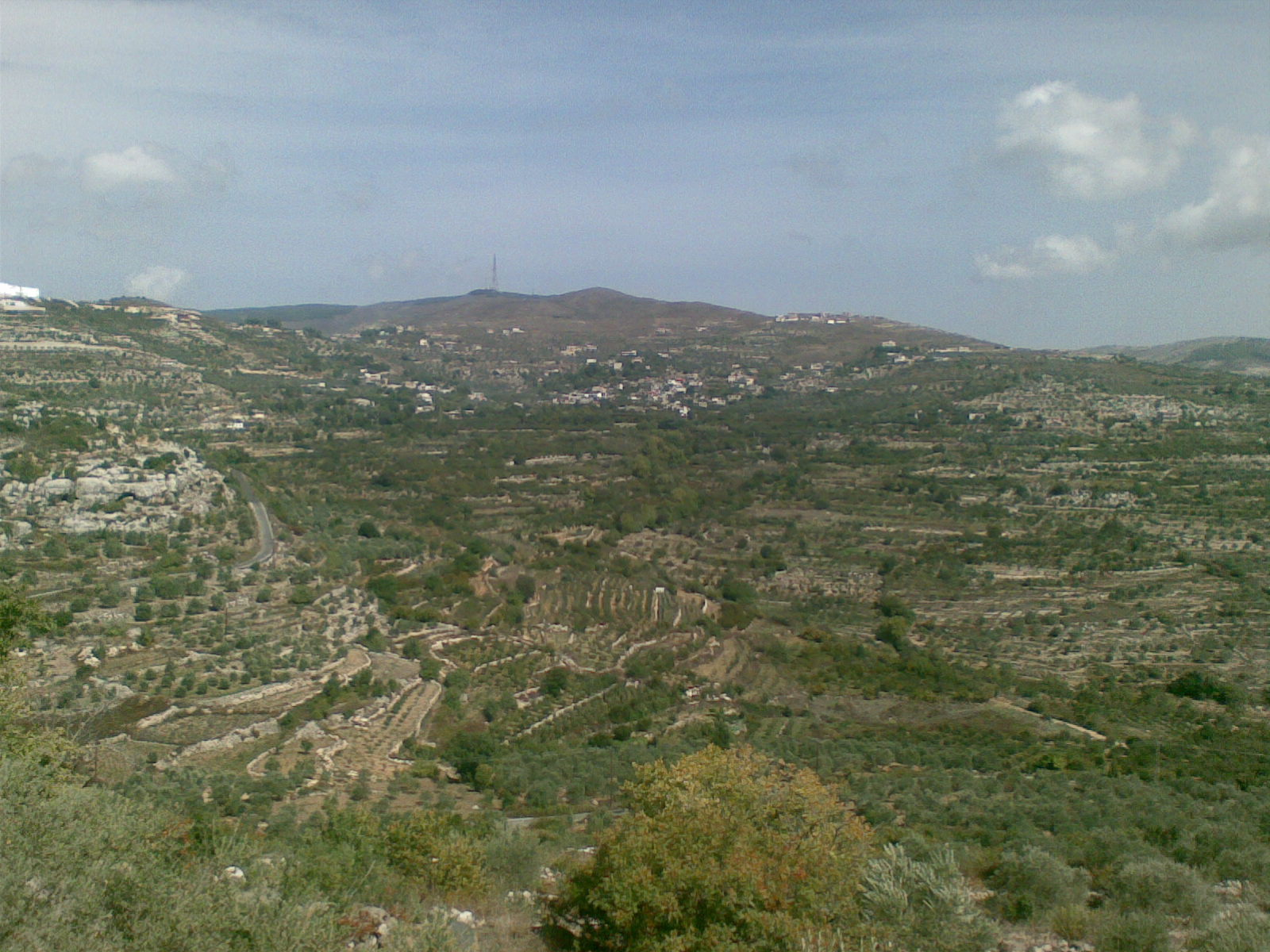
- View of Sibbeh

- Location in Syria
- Coordinates: 34°54′11.70″N 36°14′13.88″E
- Country: Syria
- Governorate: Tartus
- District: Safita
- Subdistrict: Sibbeh
- Elevation: 650 m (2,130 ft)

Population (2004)
  - Total: 3,061
- Area code: 43

Sibbeh (Arabic: سبة, also spelled Sebbeh) is a small town in northwestern Syria, located 17 kilometers (11 mi) northeast of Safita in the Tartus Governorate. It is situated atop two hills and the valley between them, in the Syrian coastal mountain range. Nearby localities Mashta al-Helu and al-Kafrun to the south, Duraykish to the west, Wadi al-Oyun to the northwest and Ayn al-Shams to the northeast.

According to the Syria Central Bureau of Statistics (CBS), Sibbeh had a population of 3,061 in the 2004 census. It is the administrative center of the Sibbeh subdistrict (nahiyah) which consisted of six localities with a collective population of 7,614. Its inhabitants are Alawites, predominantly from the Khayyatin tribal federation.

== Sources ==
- Balanche, Fabrice (2000). "Les Alaouites, l'espace et le pouvoir dans la région côtière syrienne : une intégration nationale ambiguë" (in French). Tours: Université François Rabelais.
