= Ayn al-Tineh =

Ayn al-Tineh may refer to:

== Lebanon ==
- Ain el Tineh, a village in Western Beqaa District

== Palestine ==
- El Tineh, former Palestinian village

== Syria ==
- Ayn al-Tineh, Latakia Governorate, a town
- Ayn al-Tineh, Tartus Governorate, a village
- Ain al-Tinah, a village in Rif Dimashq Governorate
- Ayn al-Tineh al-Gharbiyah, a village in Homs Governorate
- Ayn al-Tineh al-Sharqiyah, a village in Homs Governorate
