= Aqir Zayti =

Aqir Zayti عقر زيتي Aqir Zeit
- Village
- Location in Syria
- Coordinates: 34°57′43″N 36°0′23″E
- Country: Syria
- Governorate: Tartus
- District: Tartus
- Subdistrict: al-Sawda

Population (2004)
  - Total: 783
- Time zone: UTC+2 (EET)
  - Summer (DST): UTC+3 (EEST)
- City Qrya Pcode: C3409

Aqir Zayti (Arabic: عقر زيتي, also spelled Aqir Zayt or Aqir Zeit) is a village in northwestern Syria, administratively part of the Tartus Governorate, located in the Syrian Coastal Mountain Range, east of Tartus. The village of Khirbet al-Faras is located immediately south. According to the Syria Central Bureau of Statistics (CBS), Aqir Zayti had a population of 783 in the 2004 census. Its inhabitants are predominantly Ismailis, who moved there after being forced out from the nearby fortress village of Khawabi in the early 20th century.

Aqir Zayti contains the al-Hajj Khidr Tomb, an important Ismaili shrine. According to local Ismaili legend, which is partly rooted in historical facts, al-Hajj Khidr was an Ismaili religious sheikh from al-Qadmus who became popular in that area and was consequently forced out by that town's Ismaili emirs. Al-Hajj Khidr later represented the Ismaili community of Khawabi, where he and his supporters took refuge, on a delegation to meet the chief imam of the Ismailis in India. The imam in India assigned al-Hajj Khidr to become the chief missionary of Syria, replacing the aging Muhammad al-Suwaydani. Upon returning to Syria, al-Hajj Khidr's authority was rejected by the Ismaili emirs of al-Qadmus, Masyaf and Wadi al-Uyun. The two sides later clashed and al-Hajj Khidr and many of his partisans were killed. Due to reforms by Aga Khan III which forbade shrine worship, al-Hajj Khidr's shrine was dismantled in the early 20th century.

== Bibliography ==
- Boulanger, Robert, ed. (1966). The Middle East, Lebanon, Syria, Jordan, Iraq, Iran. Hachette.
- Douwes, Dick (2011). "Modern History of the Nizari Ismailis of Syria". In Farhad, Daftary (ed.). A Modern History of the Ismailis: Continuity and Change in a Muslim Community. I. B. Tauris. ISBN 9781845117177.
