= Al-Tulay'i =

Al-Tulay'i الطليعي Tli'i
- Village
- Location in Syria
- Coordinates: 34°44′19″N 36°6′21″E
- Country: Syria
- Governorate: Tartus
- District: Safita
- Subdistrict: Al-Sisiniyah

Population (2004)
  - Total: 2,123

Al-Tulay'i (Arabic: الطليعي, also spelled Tli'i) is a village in northwestern Syria, administratively part of the Tartus Governorate, southeast of Tartus. Nearby localities include Buwaydet al-Suwayqat to the north, al-Sisiniyah and al-Mitras to the northeast, Arzuna to the south, Kafr Fo to the southwest and al-Safsafah to the west. According to the Syria Central Bureau of Statistics (CBS), al-Sisiniyah had a population of 2,123 in the 2004 census. Its inhabitants are predominantly Alawites.
