= Ayn Dabish =

Ayn Dabish عين دابش Ein Dabesh
- Village
- Location in Syria
- Coordinates: 34°46′43″N 36°9′41″E
- Country: Syria
- Governorate: Tartus
- District: Safita
- Subdistrict: Al-Sisiniyah

Population (2004 census)
  - Total: 1,485

Ayn Dabish (Arabic: عين دابش, also transliterated Ain Dabesh or Ein Dabesh) is a village in northwestern Syria, administratively part of the Tartus Governorate, located southeast of Tartus. According to the Syria Central Bureau of Statistics (CBS), Ayn Dabish had a population of 1,485 in the 2004 census. Its inhabitants at least in the 1930s and 1940s were Christians, though the village may currently be religiously mixed (the neighboring villages are largely populated by Alawites and the neighboring village of al-Mitras is inhabited by Sunni Muslims).

== Sources ==
- Balanche, Fabrice (2000). "Les Alaouites, l'espace et le pouvoir dans la région côtière syrienne : une intégration nationale ambiguë" (in French). Tours: Université François Rabelais.
- Batatu, Hanna (1999). Syria's Peasantry, the Descendants of Its Lesser Rural Notables, and Their Politics. Princeton University Press. ISBN 0691002541.
