= Ruwaysa =

Al-Ruwaysa الرويسة Rweiseh
- Village
- Location in Syria
- Coordinates: 34°58′7″N 35°54′15″E
- Country: Syria
- Governorate: Tartus
- District: Tartus
- Subdistrict: Al-Sawda

Population (2004)
  - Total: 256
- Time zone: UTC+3 (EET)
  - Summer (DST): UTC+2 (EEST)
- City Qrya Pcode: C5215

Al-Ruwaysa (Arabic: الرويسة; also spelled Rweiseh) is a village in northwestern Syria, administratively part of the Tartus District of Tartus Governorate. According to the Syria Central Bureau of Statistics (CBS), Ruwaysa had a population of 256 in the 2004 census. Its inhabitants are Alawites. Ruwaysa is home to Syria's largest cement factory.

== Sources ==
- Balanche, Fabrice (2000). "Les Alaouites, l'espace et le pouvoir dans la région côtière syrienne : une intégration nationale ambiguë" (in French). Tours: Université François Rabelais.
