= Al-Safsafah, Tartus =

Town in northwestern Syria

Al-Safsafah الصفصافة
- Town
- Location within Syria
- Coordinates: 34°44′7″N 36°3′10″E
- Country: Syria
- Governorate: Tartus
- District: Tartus
- Subdistrict: Al-Safsafah

Population (2004)
  - Total: 6,011
- Time zone: UTC+2 (EET)
  - Summer (DST): UTC+3 (EEST)

Al-Safsafah (Arabic: الصفصافة) is a town in northwestern Syria, administratively part of the Tartus Governorate, located southeast of Tartus and 13 kilometers north of the border with Lebanon. Nearby localities include Ayn al-Zibdeh and Kafr Fo to the southeast, al-Tulay'i to the east, Buwaydet al-Suwayqat to the northeast, Beit al-Shaykh Yunes to the north, Ayn al-Zarqa to the northwest and al-Hamidiyah to the west. According to the Syria Central Bureau of Statistics, al-Safsafah had a population of 6,011 in the 2004 census. It is the administrative center of the al-Safsafah nahiyah ("sub-district") which contained 19 localities with a collective population of 23,416 in 2004. The inhabitants are predominantly Alawites.

== History ==
One of the principle families of the town are the Abbas family. They formerly served as aghawat ("local military leaders") during the Ottoman era.

The al-Safsafah subdistrict was detached from the Safita District and transferred to the Tartus District in 1970. During the presidency of Hafez al-Assad (1970-2000), al-Safsafah and the coastal subdistrict center of al-Hamidiyah competed for the role of capital in a newly planned mantiqah ("district") consisting of the Akkar plain of Syria. Although no new district has yet been created, in 1994 a branch of the Agricultural Bank of Syria was opened in al-Safsafah, which is normally reserved for district capitals.
