= Al-Yazdiah =

Al-Yazdiah اليازدية
- Village
- Location in Syria
- Coordinates: 34°46′19″N 36°5′14″E
- Country: Syria
- Governorate: Tartus Governorate
- District: Safita
- Elevation: 245 m (804 ft)

Population (2004 Estimate)
  - Total: ~2,500
- Time zone: UTC+2 (EET)
- Area codes: International code: 963, City code: 43

Al-Yazdiah is a Syrian village in the Safita district of Tartus governorate. It is located about 6 kilometers south of Safita city. The village is located on the western slopes of the Latakia Mountains, about 25 kilometers east of the Mediterranean coast. Dahr al-Yazdiah and Khirbet Abu Hamdan belong to the village administratively. It overlooks the Al-Abrash Dam.

It has a Christian population of Greek Orthodox, Melkite Catholic, and Evangelical Presbyterian denominations, with a minority of Alawites.

== Church of the Dormition of the Virgin Mary ==
Al-Yazdiah Church, dedicated to the Dormition of the Virgin Mary, whose feast is celebrated on August 15, is an historic church originally built in 1835. The first structure was a simple wooden building supported by wooden pillars known as "swamik," "minarets," and "budduds," and roofed with soil. The church was later rebuilt in stone in 1885, covering an area of approximately 200 square meters. The thick stone walls, reaching up to 140 cm, give the impression of a larger structure. It is believed that the Russian-Palestinian Society funded and oversaw the construction of this stone church, as well as the churches of Bdada and Beit Shoebat, based on the dates engraved on these buildings.

In 1997, the church underwent an expansion of 50 square meters, maintaining its original architectural style. The iconostasis, made of intricately carved and decorated wood, was also created during this renovation. Its icons, which are modern and hand-painted, coexist with several older icons. The church houses two old stone baptismal fonts, one of which was replaced by a portable copper font during the renovation.
