= Yahmur =

Yahmur يحمور
- Town
- Location in Syria
- Coordinates: 34°49′11″N 35°58′8″E
- Country: Syria
- Governorate: Tartus
- District: Tartus
- Subdistrict: Khirbet al-Ma'zah

Population (2004)
  - Total: 3,772

Yahmur (Arabic: يحمور; also spelled Yahmour) is a town in northwestern Syria, administratively part of the Tartus Governorate. It is located along the road between Safita in the east and Tartus to the west. According to the Syria Central Bureau of Statistics (CBS), Yahmur had a population of 3,722 in the 2004 census. Its inhabitants are predominantly Alawites. Nearby is Chastel Rouge (Qal'at Yahmur), a Crusader-era castle.
