= Oyoun al-Wadi =

Oyoun al-Wadi عيون الوادي
- Village
- Location in Syria
- Coordinates: 34°52′40″N 36°16′18″E
- Country: Syria
- Governorate: Homs
- District: Homs
- Subdistrict: Shin

Population (2004)
  - Total: 772
- Time zone: UTC+3 (AST)

Oyoun al-Wadi (Arabic: عيون الوادي, romanized: ʿUyūn al-Wādī), also transliterated Oyoun Alwadi) is a village in central Syria located northwest of Homs in the Homs Governorate. It is located just west of Mashta al-Helu. According to the Syria Central Bureau of Statistics, Oyoun al-Wadi had a population of 772 in the 2004 census. In 2012, it had an estimated permanent population of 2,000. Its inhabitants are predominantly Greek Orthodox Christians.

As of 2012, the principal sources of income for Oyoun al-Wadi's inhabitants derived from remittances from the village's expatriates and the typically productive apple harvests.

== Geography ==
Oyoun al-Wadi in located in the northern Homs Governorate on the border with the Tartus Governorate. It is 62 kilometers (39 mi) east of Tartus, 65 kilometers (40 mi) northwest of Homs and 67 kilometers (42 mi) southwest of Hama. The village is bordered on its west by the town of Mashta al-Helu and on its east by the villages of Juwaykat and Turayz, both of which are incorporated in the municipality of Oyoun al-Wadi. The village lies in a valley with an average elevation of 700 meters (2,300 ft) above sea level, surrounded by four mountains of the Syrian coastal range: Jabal Dimas, Jabal Ramti, Jabal Dahr al-Dib and Jabal Bal'a.

The mountains are covered in forests of oak, laurel, terebinth, hawthorn, and poplar. In the Ramti plain of the valley are vineyards and groves of cherry, peach, plum, apple and fig trees, while the Qasuma plains are planted with wheat, lentil and chickpea fields.

== History ==
In the early 18th century, Oyoun al-Wadi was called 'Oyoun Affan' and was the property of an agha, Hasan al-Turkmani. At that time, Sabeq Suleiman Maalouf and his nephew Elias Maalouf from Kfarakab (in modern Lebanon) were given safe haven in the hamlet by Hasan al-Turkmani. Elias soon after moved to found the nearby village of Mashta al-Helu, while Suleiman remained at Oyoun Affan. Hasan al-Turkmani hired Suleiman to manage his properties and eventually relocated and left Oyoun Affan to Suleiman. Most of the families of the modern village trace their descent to Suleiman.

Around the mid-19th century, the village gained its present name 'Oyoun al-Wadi' ('Springs of the Valley'). Around this time Oyoun al-Wadi was one of the few locations in the coastal mountains where silk mills were constructed; the other two places were in Mashta al-Helu and Safita. The rise of sericulture also resulted in the significant growth of mulberry trees in the vicinity. In 1888, the village church, the Church of the Virgin Mary, was established through the patronage of Hanna Mousa Maalouf. Beginning in 1890, there were significant waves of emigration from the village to Latin America and the United States, followed in later decades to the Gulf Arab states. The number of emigrants is estimated by locals to be 30,000–40,000.

In 1926 Oyoun al-Wadi's first primary school was established, followed in the 1940s with a private secondary school. A second church, the Church of St. John, was established in c. 1970 by Hanna Zakhour. The village was connected to the electric grid in 1964. Other infrastructure projects in the village were patronized by local residents, including the paving and lighting of its roads, funded by Mikhail Hoda and Matanius Wasfi Salloum, respectively.

== Bibliography ==
- Aji, Michel Ghosn (2019). Mashta Al Helou - A Village Tale. ISBN 978-9933-18-861-0.
- Balanche, Fabrice (2000). "Les Alaouites, l'espace et le pouvoir dans la région côtière syrienne : une intégration nationale ambiguë" (in French). Tours: Université François Rabelais.
