= Jinin =

Jinin may refer to:

- Jinín, a municipality and village in the Czech Republic
- Jenin (Arabic: جنين, romanized: Jinīn), a city in Palestine
- Jenin, Syria (Arabic: جنين; also spelled Jinin), a village in Syria

== See also ==
- Jenin (disambiguation)
