= Kafrun Badra =

Kafrun Badra كفرون بدرة
- Village
- Location in Syria
- Coordinates: 34°50′55″N 36°14′48″E
- Country: Syria
- Governorate: Tartus
- District: Safita
- Subdistrict: Mashta al-Helu

Population (2004 census)
  - Total: 302
- Time zone: UTC+3 (EET)
  - Summer (DST): UTC+2 (EEST)

Kafrun Badra (كفرون بدرة; also spelled Kafroun Badra) is a village in northwestern Syria, administratively part of the Safita District of the Tartous Governorate.

The anthropologist Fabrice Balanche noted that Kafrun Badra's population remained largely stagnant between 1960 and 1994, remaining approximately 340. According to the Syria Central Bureau of Statistics (CBS), Kafrun Badra had a population of 302 in the 2004 census. Its inhabitants are predominantly Christians.

Kafrun Badra's first school, which was gender-mixed, was opened by the Russian Orthodox Imperial Palestine Society in 1887 with the sponsorship of the area's agha, Abu Mitri. The school is presently called the Martyr George Ramez Akkari School and as of 2022 it enrolled 122 students from the village and nearby Nabe Karkar.

== Sources ==
- Balanche, Fabrice (2000). "Les Alaouites, l'espace et le pouvoir dans la région côtière syrienne : une intégration nationale ambiguë" (in French). Tours: Université François Rabelais.
