= Al-Sisiniyah =

Town in northwestern Syria

Al-Sisiniyah السيسنية Sisnyeh
- Town
- Location in Syria
- Coordinates: 34°46′52″N 36°8′35″E
- Country: Syria
- Governorate: Tartus
- District: Safita
- Subdistrict: Al-Sisiniyah

Population (2004)
  - Total: 2,667

Al-Sisiniyah (Arabic: السيسنية, also spelled Sisnyeh) is a town in northwestern Syria, administratively part of the Tartus Governorate, located southeast of Tartus. Nearby localities include Safita to the north, al-Bariqiyah to the northeast, Habnamrah and Marmarita to the east, al-Zarah to the southeast, al-Tulay'i to the southwest, Buwaydet al-Suwayqat to the west and Beit al-Shaykh Yunes to the northwest. According to the Syria Central Bureau of Statistics (CBS), al-Sisiniyah had a population of 2,667 in the 2004 census. It is the administrative center of the al-Sisiniyah nahiyah ("sub-district") which consisted of 19 localities with a collective population of 22,018 in 2004. The town's inhabitants are a mix of Alawites and Christians, with each community having its own mukhtar ("village head").
