= Al-Mitras =

Al-Mitras المتراس Mtrass
- Village
- Location in Syria
- Coordinates: 34°46′39″N 36°11′8″E
- Country: Syria
- Governorate: Tartus
- District: Safita
- Subdistrict: Al-Sisiniyah

Population (2004)
  - Total: 2,138

Al-Mitras (Arabic: المتراس, also spelled Mtrass) is a village in northwestern Syria, administratively part of the Tartus Governorate, located southeast of Tartus. Nearby localities include Marmarita and Zweitina to the east, al-Zarah to the southeast, al-Tulay'i to the southwest, al-Sisiniyah to the west and al-Bariqiyah to the north. According to the Syria Central Bureau of Statistics (CBS), al-Mitras had a population of 2,138 in the 2004 census. Its inhabitants are predominantly Sunni Muslims.
