= Beit Alyan =

Beit Alyan بيت عليان
- Village
- Location in Syria
- Coordinates: 34°51′48″N 35°56′27″E
- Country: Syria
- Governorate: Tartus
- District: Tartus
- Subdistrict: Tartus

Population (2004)
  - Total: 1,586
- Time zone: UTC+3 (EET)
  - Summer (DST): UTC+2 (EEST)
- City Qrya Pcode: C5215

Beit Alyan (Arabic: بيت عليان; also spelled Beit al-Ayan) is a village in northwestern Syria, administratively part of the Tartus District of Tartus Governorate. According to the Syria Central Bureau of Statistics (CBS), Beit Alyan had a population of 1,586 in the 2004 census. Its inhabitants are Alawites.

== Sources ==
- Balanche, Fabrice (2000). Les Alaouites, l'espace et le pouvoir dans la région côtière syrienne : une intégration nationale ambiguë (Thesis) (in French). Tours: Université François Rabelais.
