= Khawabi =

Khawabi الخوابي Qal'at Khawabi
- Village
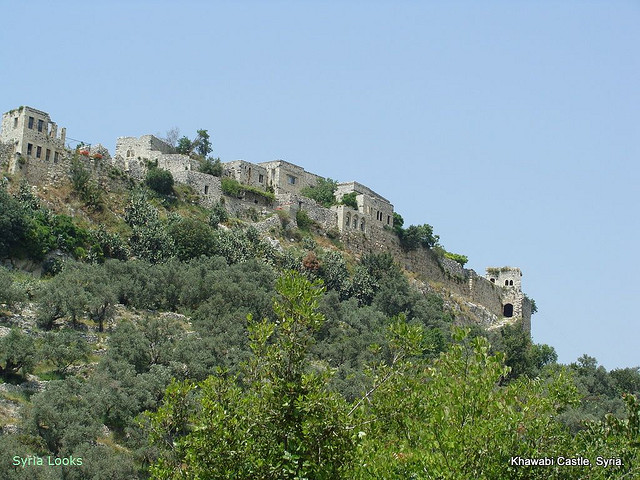
- Khawabi Castle

- Location within Syria
- Coordinates: 34°58′22″N 36°0′8″E
- Country: Syria
- Governorate: Tartus
- District: Tartus
- Subdistrict: Al-Sawda

Population (2004)
  - Total: 1,039
- Time zone: UTC+2 (EET)
  - Summer (DST): UTC+3 (EEST)

Khawabi (Arabic: الخوابي), also spelled Qal'at al-Khawabi (Arabic: قلعة الخوابي) is a village and medieval citadel in northwestern Syria, administratively part of the Tartus Governorate, located 20 kilometers northeast of Tartus and 12 kilometers east of al-Sawda. According to the Syria Central Bureau of Statistics, Khawabi had a population of 1,039 in the 2004 census. Its inhabitants are predominantly Sunni Muslims. The village formerly had a significant Ismaili population until the early 20th century, and during the medieval period, its citadel (Qal'at Khawabi) served as a center of the Ismaili community when they were known as the Assassins. The citadel itself has been inhabited since at least the 12th century.

== Geography ==
Khawabi is situated in a hilly area, surrounded by olive groves, in the Coastal Mountain Range. Nearby localities include al-Sawda and to the west, Al-Annazah to the northwest, al-Qamsiyah to the north, Brummanet Raad to the northeast, al-Shaykh Badr to the east, Khirbet al-Faras to the south and Bimalkah to the southwest.

== History ==
=== Early history ===
Like many of the other castles in coastal Syria, the castle of Khawabi has its origins in the Phoenician era (1200–539 BC). In 985, under Muslim rule, the geographer al-Muqaddasi noted that Hisn al-Khawabi ('the Citadel of Khawabi') was part of Jund Hims (the military district of Homs). In 1025, when the area was controlled by the Byzantine Empire, the citadel was restored by the Byzantines. Khawabi later came into the possession of one Muhammad ibn Ali ibn Hamid.

=== Nizari Isma'ili fortress ===
The Crusaders, who referred to the citadel as La Coible, acquired Khawabi from its owner, Ibn Hamid, in 1111 and assigned its governorship to a local lord. However, author and expert in Isma'ili studies, Peter Willey, notes that there is no evidence the Crusaders ever held it, though they did refer to it as Coible and considered it an endangerment to their coastal mountain positions. A short time following the Nizari Isma'ilis' capture of Masyaf in 1141, they proceeded to conquer Khawabi. By the time the Isma'ili chief Rashid al-Din Sinan renovated the citadel into a formidable possession in 1160, Khawabi had developed into an Isma'ili religious center. Part of Sinan's renovations included the construction of a tower at the citadel's entrance and the replacement of some walls. Khawabi became geostrategically important for the Isma'ilis since it provided further defense for other Isma'ili mountain fortresses to its southwest.

After the Isma'ilis assassinated Raymond, the eldest son of Bohemond IV, prince of Antioch at the Cathedral of Our Lady of Tortosa in Tartus, Bohemond and a reinforcement of Templars assaulted Khawabi in 1214. The Isma'ilis requested aid from the Ayyubid ruler of Aleppo, az-Zahir Ghazi, who in turn appealed to his rival and uncle al-Adil, the Ayyubid sultan of Egypt. Az-Zahir's relief army was dealt a major setback when the Muslim force was nearly destroyed in a Crusader ambush at Jabal Bahra, on the approaches of Khawabi. However, after al-Adil's son, al-Mu'azzam of Damascus, launched several raids against Bohemond's district of Tripoli, destroying all of its villages, Bohemond was compelled to withdraw from Khawabi and issue an apology to az-Zahir.

=== Mamluk period ===
The Isma'ilis maintained their control over Khawabi until the beginning of Mamluk rule in Syria. In 1273 the Mamluk sultan Baybars annexed and destroyed the citadel. From that point on, although the Ismailis had continued to live in the area with limited autonomy under Mamluk rule, the dismantled fortress was no longer used for military purposes. The remainder of the castle's infrastructure was adapted for agricultural or domestic purposes. In 1484 the Mamluk sultan Qaytbay ended the tax on loom products, cattle slaughtering and shoe repairing for Khawabi and nearby al-Kahf.

=== Ottoman period ===
During the Ottoman period (1516–1918), the Khawabi citadel became a center of Khawabi Nahiya (Nahiye Havabi in Turkish; 'subdistrict of Khawabi'). The Khawabi Nahiya was originally part of the Tripoli Sanjak, part of the larger Tripoli Eyalet. In 1563 Khawabi was administrativelty separated to form part of the Jableh Sanjak, along with several other subdistricts in the coastal mountain range. The Sha'ir family from Tripoli served as the governors of Khawabi in the 18th century after being driven out of Batroun.

In 1831 the citadel and its nahiya became one of the 13 subdistricts of the Latakia Sanjak, then under the authority of the governors of Acre. In 1865 Khawabi was reassigned to the Marqab Sanjak, part of the larger province of Tripoli. The Ottomans constructed a mosque in 1892–93 named after Sultan Abdul Hamid II. The administrative region of Khawabi contained a mixture of religious sects according to the Ottoman census of 1878. Alawites constituted 47% of its total population of 1,837, Isma'ilis 19%, Greek Orthodox Christians 15%, Sunni Muslims 14% and Maronite Christians 5%. The Sunni inhabitants of Khawabi's fortress village descend from the mainly Kurdish tribesmen settled there by Baybars or his 13th-century successors. By the early 20th century, towards the ends of Ottoman rule, the Sunni notables and aghas of Khawabi owned vast tracts of land inhabited by Alawite farming communities between Duraykish and Qadmus and the fortress village served as the nahiye headquarters. The French novelist Maurice Barrès, who visited in 1914, noted that the agricultural products of the nahiye flowed to Khawabi's market.

=== French Mandatory period ===
In 1918–19, during the initial period of French Mandatory rule that soon followed the Ottoman defeat in Syria in World War I, the center of the nahiye was transferred to the Christian village of al-Sawda by the French authorities as a consequence of Khawabi's participation in the anti-French Syrian Coastal Revolt led by Sheikh Salih al-Ali, an Alawite sheikh from the area. Al-Ali had used Khawabi's citadel to store weaponry during the revolt. Most of the fortress village's Isma'ili inhabitants had been evacuated to nearby villages while a smaller number had emigrated the Isma'ili-majority towns of Masyaf and Salamiya in the district of Hama. The French authorities set fire to the citadel to punish Khawabi's inhabitants for their resistance against the French occupation.

During the French Mandatory period (1920–1946), Khawabi became overshadowed by al-Sawda, with people traveling to the latter town for commercial transactions instead of Khawabi, which also lost its court, police station and civil registry office. While Khawabi rapidly declined, al-Sawda became a dynamic regional center with a clinic, a secondary school and a wide range of shops. The Isma'ili population in the village had been gradually declining and by 1930 none of the Isma'ili inhabitants remained. Until the present day, Khawabi's inhabitants are mostly Sunni Muslims. Most of the Isma'ili residents fled the village following disputes with its Sunni Muslim residents over land and livestock. The dispute ultimately prompted the Sunnis to invite Alawite militias, who were also in conflict with the Isma'ilis during that time, to assault the community. About 100 residents were killed and thousands more in the area fled to Tartus. Most of Khawabi's former Isma'ili inhabitants relocated to the nearby hamlet of Aqir Zayti. Meanwhile, Alawite tribal sheikhs used the opportunity of Khawabi's weakened status to confiscate part of the Sunni aghas' landholdings outside the village.

=== Post-Syrian independence ===
In the early 1950s, the modern village of Khawabi was founded below the fortress. Before, all the inhabitants had lived inside the fortress. Compounding their losses of land during the French Mandate, the notables of Khawabi lost the bulk of their remaining tracts through the agrarian reform laws of the 1950s and 1960s. Most of the notables consequently moved to Tartus to work in trade, with many gradually cutting off ties to their relatives in the village. Between 1970 and 1998 much of the strongly-built area of the fortress's northern end was dismantled. A house adjacent to the central citadel serves as the residence of Khawabi's community headman. Khawabi lacks a municipal authority and its only connection to the state is through its agricultural cooperative, which negotiates with the state to provide services to the village. The citadel is currently registered as private property by the Syrian Directorate of Antiquities and Museums.

The current inhabitants, who are split between eight main families, own their homes in the village and are largely self-sufficient. In 1994, Khawabi had a population of 880, nearly all Sunni Muslims, with an Alawite minority living in a hamlet on the edge of the main village. The main village consisted of a narrow street, which was paved in 1993, lined with a cluster of houses built of stone, concrete and wood and attached to stables, which led to unsanitary conditions on the street. On the slope above were a few scattered homes built of reinforced concrete. Though the village was connected to electricity, there were no telephone lines until 1997. As of 2000, public transport in the village consisted of two minibus line connections to Tartus, where some of the inhabitants worked in cement factories or as port dockers, with seldom few employed in the civil service. Commerce in the village was limited to a butcher's shop, two barbershops, a few grocery stores and an olive press that was built in 1925. Most of the working population was engaged in agriculture, either consisting of raising sheep and goats on the scrublands of the surrounding slopes or olive groves grown on small plots typically around ten dunams. Underneath the olive trees the local farmers planted grains or vegetables for subsistence purposes. Khawabi remained relatively underdeveloped and characterized by illiteracy, high birth rates and early female marriage, compared to the surrounding Alawite communities.

== Fortress architecture ==
Qal'at Khawabi measures 350 meters by 200 meters, having a total area of roughly 70,000 square meters. It has a single entrance which is preceded by two flights of shallow stairways acquainted for cavalry. The first flight consists of 20 steps, leading to the second flight which has 40 steps into the still-preserved gatehouse at the northern end of the fortress. The gatehouse has a double entrance protected by archways and its upper floor's windows have been enlarged.

The fortress consists of two principal sections, Harat Rashid al-Din Sinan (referred to as Bayt al-Agha by locals) and Harat al-Saki. The former occupies the upper area of the citadel and many of its historic characteristics, with the exception of its cellars and stables, virtually disappeared with the construction of new housing in the 1990s. The visible parts of the wall in this section consist of thin reinforced concrete, typical of the architectural designs of the late Ottoman era. Harat al-Saki retains much of its historical character, with its ruined residences, medieval walls and cellars. Although a number of residents of the citadel have built new homes by dismantling some parts of the walls, most of Harat al-Saki's residents have built relocated outside of the citadel walls.

The eastern part of Qal'at Khawabi contains the fortress's main defenses, although its northern end is also strongly buttressed. The latter part of the fortress possesses chambers meant for water storage. In the center of the fortress stands the citadel which is protected by double-walls. A narrow north–south path, from which two alleyways to the eastern and western sections branch out, runs through the middle of the fortress. Willey considered the remaining stone masonry of the outside walls to be "fine," disagreeing with Syrian architecture expert Ross Burns' generally unfavorable opinion of Khawabi's stonework.

== See also ==
- List of castles in Syria

== Bibliography ==
- Balanche, Fabrice (2006). La région alaouite et le pouvoir syrien (in French). Karthala Editions. ISBN 2845868189.
- Boulanger, Robert (1966). The Middle East, Lebanon, Syria, Jordan, Iraq, Iran. Hachette.
- Burns, Ross (2009) The Monuments of Syria: A Guide (third edition) I.B. Tauris, London, page 140, ISBN 978-1-84511-947-8
- Daftary, Farhad (1992). The Isma'Ilis: Their History and Doctrines. Cambridge University Press. ISBN 0521429749.
- Daftary, Farhad (2007). The Isma'ilis: Their History and Doctrines. Cambridge University Press. ISBN 978-0521850841.
- Douwes, Dick (2011). "Modern History of the Nizari Ismailis of Syria". In Farhad, Daftary (ed.). A Modern History of the Ismailis: Continuity and Change in a Muslim Community. I. B. Tauris. ISBN 9781845117177.
- Hourani, Alexander (2010). New Documents on the History of Mount Lebanon and Arabistan in the 10th and 11th Centuries H.
- Humphreys, Stephen (1977), From Saladin to the Mongols: The Ayyubids of Damascus, 1193-1260, SUNY Press, ISBN 0-87395-263-4
- Moosa, Matti (1987). Extremist Shiites: The Ghulat Sects. Syracuse University Press. ISBN 0-8156-2411-5.
- Raphael, Kate (2011). Muslim Fortresses in the Levant: Between Crusaders and Mongols. Taylor & Francis US. ISBN 978-0415569255.
- Runciman, Steven (1987). A History of the Crusades: The Kingdom of Jerusalem and the Frankish East, 1100-1187. CUP Archive. ISBN 0521347718.
- Setton, Kenneth M. (2006). A History of the Crusades: The First Hundred Years. University of Wisconsin Press. ISBN 0299048349.
