= Sheikh Saad =

Sheikh Saad or variants may refer to:

- Al-Shaykh Saad, a town in Daraa Governorate, Syria
- Al-Shaykh Saad, Tartus Governorate, Syria
- ash-Sheikh Sa'd, a Palestinian village in the Jerusalem Governorate
- Battle of Sheikh Sa'ad, in Mesopotamia, 1916
- Saad Al-Salim Al-Sabah, Emir of Kuwait (15–24 January 2006)

== See also ==
- Sheikh Said
