= Bureij (disambiguation) =

Bureij may refer to the following places:

- Bureij — Palestinian refugee camp in the central Gaza Strip
- Bureij, Homs, a village in the Homs Governorate in Syria.
- Bureij, Tartus, a village in the Tartus Governorate in Syria.
- Al-Burayj, Jerusalem, a depopulated Palestinian village that was near Jerusalem.
