= Beit Kammunah =

Beit Kammunah بيت كمونة
- Village
- Location in Syria
- Coordinates: 34°51′37″N 35°56′0″E
- Country: Syria
- Governorate: Tartus
- District: Tartus District
- Subdistrict: Tartus Subdistrict

Population (2004)
  - Total: 1,803
- Time zone: UTC+3 (EET)
  - Summer (DST): UTC+2 (EEST)
- City Qrya Pcode: C5215

Beit Kammunah (Arabic: بيت كمونة) is a village in northwestern Syria, administratively part of the Tartus District of Tartus Governorate. According to the Syria Central Bureau of Statistics (CBS), Beit Kammunah had a population of 1,803 in the 2004 census. Its inhabitants are Alawites.

== Sources ==
- Balanche, Fabrice (2000). "Les Alaouites, l'espace et le pouvoir dans la région côtière syrienne : une intégration nationale ambiguë" (in French). Tours: Université François Rabelais.
