= Ayn al-Tineh, Tartus Governorate =

Ayn al-Tineh عين التينة
- Village
- Location in Syria
- Coordinates: 34°54′7″N 36°13′10″E
- Country: Syria
- Governorate: Tartus
- District: Safita
- Subdistrict: Sibbeh

Population (2004)
  - Total: 818
- Time zone: UTC+3 (EET)
  - Summer (DST): UTC+2 (EEST)
- City Qrya Pcode: C5523

Ayn al-Tineh (Arabic: عين التينة) is a village in northwestern Syria, administratively part of the Safita District in Tartus Governorate. According to the Syria Central Bureau of Statistics (CBS), Ayn al-Tineh had a population of 818 in the 2004 census. Its inhabitants are Alawites.

== Sources ==
- Balanche, Fabrice (2000). "Les Alaouites, l'espace et le pouvoir dans la région côtière syrienne : une intégration nationale ambiguë" (in French). Tours: Université François Rabelais.
