= Bayt al-Shaykh Yunis =

Village in northwestern Syria

Bayt al-Shaykh Yunis بيت الشيخ يونس
- Village
- Location in Syria
- Coordinates: 34°47′52″N 36°4′58″E
- Country: Syria
- Governorate: Tartus
- District: Safita
- Subdistrict: Safita

Population 2004 census
  - Total: 2,199

Bayt al-Shaykh Yunis (Arabic: بيت الشيخ يونس, also spelled Beit al-Sheikh Yunes) is a village in northwestern Syria, administratively part of the Tartus Governorate. It is located between Safita (to the east) and Ras al-Khashufah (to the west). According to the Syria Central Bureau of Statistics (CBS), Bayt al-Shaykh Yunis had a population of 2,199 in the 2004 census. Its inhabitants are predominantly Alawites.
