= Khirbet Abu Hamdan =

Khirbet Abu Hamdan خربة أبو حمدان
- Village
- Location in Syria
- Coordinates: 34°47′21″N 36°5′37″E
- Country: Syria
- Governorate: Tartus
- District: Safita District
- Subdistrict: Safita

Population (2004)
  - Total: 925
- Time zone: UTC+3 (EET)
  - Summer (DST): UTC+2 (EEST)
- City Qrya Pcode: C5481

Khirbet Abu Hamdan (Arabic: خربة أبو حمدان) is a Syrian village in the Safita District in Tartous Governorate. According to the Syria Central Bureau of Statistics (CBS), Khirbet Abu Hamdan had a population of 925 in the 2004 census.
