= Bureij, Tartus =

Bureij البريج Breij
- Village
- Location in Syria
- Coordinates: 34°58′11″N 35°55′47″E
- Country: Syria
- Governorate: Tartus
- District: Tartus
- Subdistrict: Al-Sawda

Population 2004
  - Total: 321

Bureij (Arabic: البريج, romanized: al-Burayj; also transliterated Breij) is a village in northwestern Syria, administratively part of the Tartus Governorate. It is part of the al-Sawda municipality. According to the Syria Central Bureau of Statistics (CBS), Bureij had a population of 321 in the 2004 census. Its inhabitants are Christians. It became part of the al-Sawda municipality in 1975 and is represented by one seat in its council. Its relatively low growth rate, along with that of most other Christian communities in the area is mainly attributed to high emigration and low birth rates.

== Sources ==
- Balanche, Fabrice (2000). "Les Alaouites, l'espace et le pouvoir dans la région côtière syrienne : une intégration nationale ambiguë" (in French). Tours: Université François Rabelais.
