= Maraqiya =

Maraqiya مرقية
- Village
- Location in Syria
- Coordinates: 35°1′51″N 35°54′56″E
- Country: Syria
- Governorate: Tartus
- District: Tartus District
- Subdistrict: Al-Sawda

Population (2004)
  - Total: 1,254
- Time zone: UTC+3 (EET)
  - Summer (DST): UTC+2 (EEST)
- City Qrya Pcode: C5305

Maraqiya (Arabic: مرقية) is a Syrian village located in Tartus District, Tartus. According to the Syria Central Bureau of Statistics (CBS), Maraqiya had a population of 1,254 in the 2004 census.
