= Chastel Rouge =

- قلعة يحمور (Arabic)
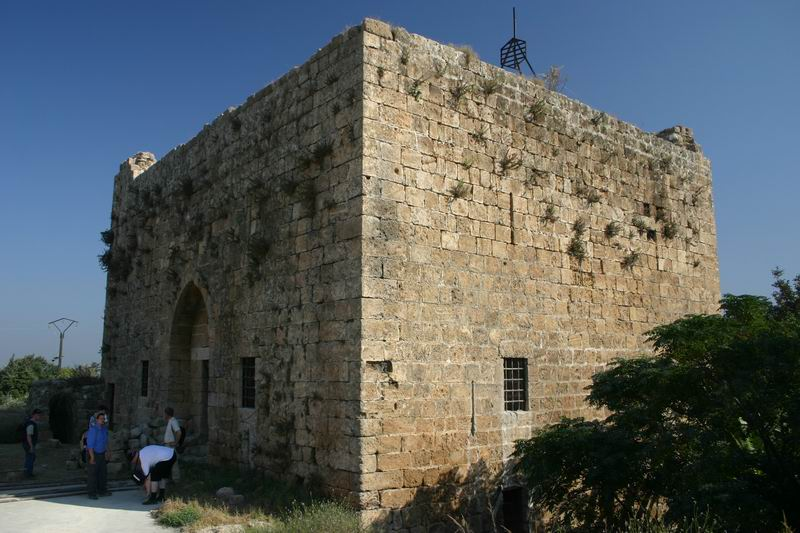
- Chastel Rouge

- Location within Syria
- 34°48′44″N 35°58′14″E
- Location: Syria
- Region: Tartus Governorate

Chastel Rouge, also called Qal’at Yahmur (Arabic: قلعة يحمور, Castle of Yahmur), is a small Crusader stronghold in the North West of Syria that belonged to the County of Tripoli. It is also identified as Castrum Rubrum mentioned in Latin texts. The castle stands in the village of Yahmur, at 12 kilometres' distance from Tartus and 10 kilometres from Safita, where the Tortosa and Chastel Blanc Crusader castles can be found.

== History ==
Little is known about the capture and early development of the place by the Crusaders. This is because it was a castle of secondary importance, and also to some doubts in identifying the castle in medieval sources. However, it was granted by Tancred to Pons, Count of Tripoli in 1112. Later on, the stronghold seems to be in the hands of a Frankish family, the Montolieu, vassals of the Counts of Tripoli. Thus, it was part of the network of castles defending the County, for example Crac des Chevaliers, Chastel Blanc and Areimeh.

In 1177/78, Raymond III transferred the stronghold to the Hospitallers, and the Montolieus were given 400 bezants as compensation. In 1188, Saladin attacked the stronghold and destroyed it. The Crusaders could most probably retrieve it and keep it until they lost the County one century later, during the reign of Mamluk sultan Qalawun in 1289.

== Description of the place ==
The village of Yahmur is located in the coastal plain between Tartus and Tripoli. Consequently, Chastel Rouge did not possess natural defences, as many other castles did.

The stronghold consists in a two-floor donjon, 16 metres long and 14 metres wide, enclosed in rectangular outer walls of 42 metres' length and 37 metres' width, with towers on the north-western and south-eastern angles. The first floor was divided in two storeys by a wooden floor that does not exist any more. Upper floors can be reached through stairs running along the walls inside and outside the donjon.

The construction cannot be dated with exactitude, however two main phases can be recognised: the first phase dates from the beginning of the 12th century and includes the outer walls, while the donjon was built at the beginning of the 13th century.

Excavations in the stronghold also found ruins date back to the Phoenician era, in addition to inscriptions from the Greco-Roman period.

== See also ==
- List of castles in Syria
- List of Crusader castles

== Bibliography ==
- Jean Mesqui, Châteaux d’Orient, Liban, Syrie, Ed. Hazan, 2001, p. 67–68.
- Hugh Kennedy, Crusader Castles, Cambridge University Press, 1994, p. 72–75.
- Boas, Adrian (2006), Archaeology of the Military Orders: A Survey of the Urban Centres, Rural Settlements and Castles of the Military Orders in the Latin East (c.1120-1291), Routledge, ISBN 9781134422845.
- Murray, Alan V. (2015), The Crusades to the Holy Land: The Essential Reference Guide, ABC-CLIO, ISBN 9781610697804.
