= Nabe Karkar =

Nabe Karkar نبع كركر
- Village
- Location in Syria
- Coordinates: 34°50′40″N 36°14′53″E
- Country: Syria
- Governorate: Tartus
- District: Safita
- Subdistrict: Mashta al-Helu

Population (2004 census)
  - Total: 273
- Time zone: UTC+3 (EET)
  - Summer (DST): UTC+2 (EEST)

Nabe Karkar (نبع كركر; also spelled Naba'a Kerker) is a village in northwestern Syria, administratively part of the Safita District of the Tartous Governorate.

The anthropologist Fabrice Balanche noted that Nabe Karkar's population declined significantly between 1960 and 1994, from 220 inhabitants to 70. According to the Syria Central Bureau of Statistics (CBS), Nabe Karkar had a population of 273 in the 2004 census. Its inhabitants are predominantly Christians.

== Sources ==
- Balanche, Fabrice (2000). "Les Alaouites, l'espace et le pouvoir dans la région côtière syrienne : une intégration nationale ambiguë" (in French). Tours: Université François Rabelais.
