= Cham Palaces and Hotels =

Syria-based hotel chain

Cham Palaces and Hotels (Arabic: سلسلة فنادق الشام) is a five star Syrian-based hotel chain. The chain has hotels in major Syrian cities and touristic spots, and has already expanded into neighboring Jordan.

== Hotels ==
=== Syria ===
- Apamee Cham Palace - Hama, Syria
- Badia Cham Hotel - Deir ez-Zor, Syria
- Bosra Cham Palace - Bosra, Syria
- Cham Palace - Damascus, Syria
- Ebla Cham Palace - Damascus, Syria
- Fourat Cham Palace - Deir ez-Zor, Syria
- Cote d'Azur de Cham Resort - Latakia, Syria
- Cote d'Azur de Cham Residence - Latakia, Syria
- Safita Cham Palace - Safita, Syria
- Cham Golf and Country Club - Damascus, Syria

=== Jordan ===
- Amman Cham Palace - Amman, Jordan
