= Chastel Blanc =

Medieval structure in western Syria

- Safita, Syria
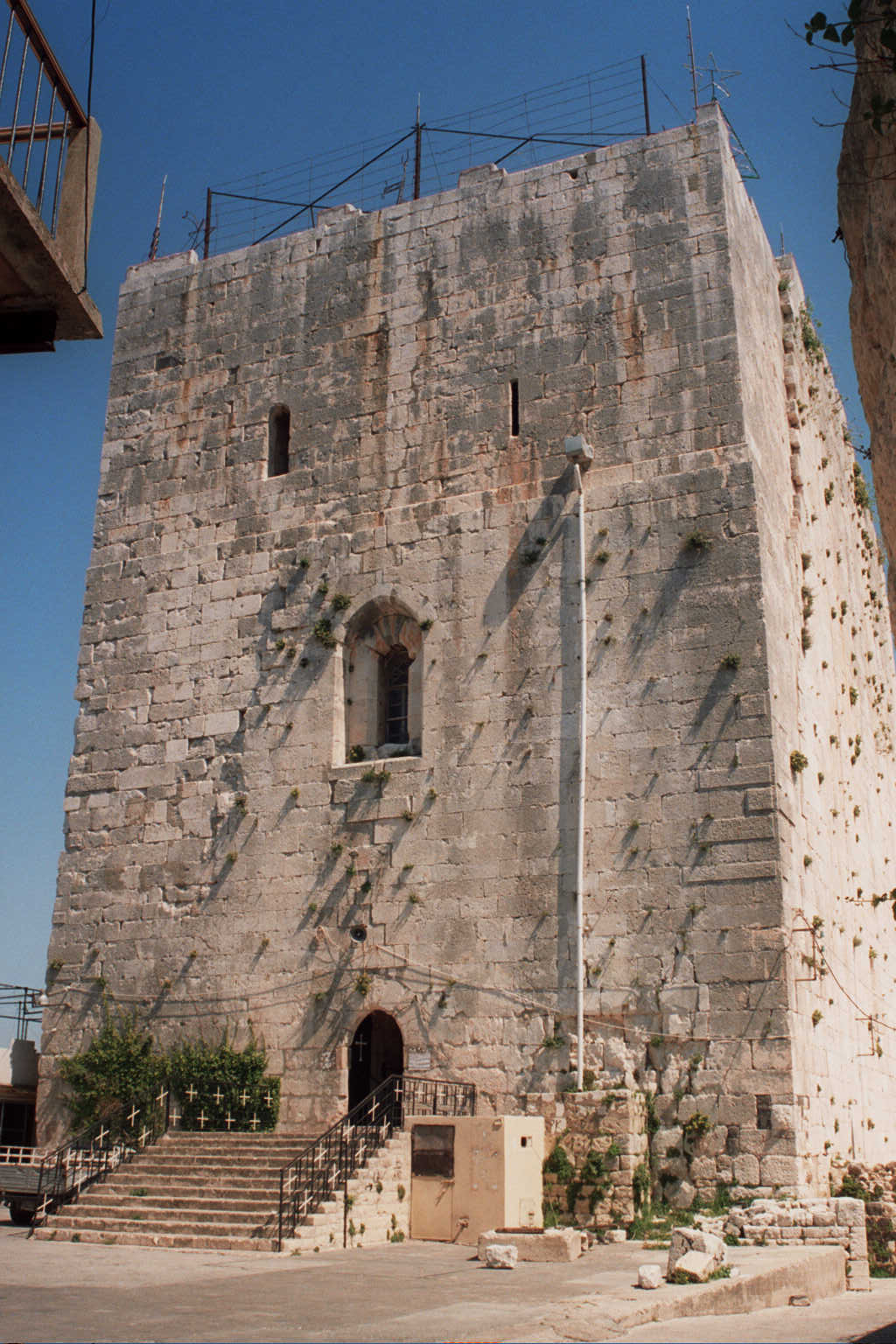
- Chastel Blanc's keep

Site information
- Type: Castle

Location
- Coordinates: 34°49′14″N 36°07′01″E

Chastel Blanc (Arabic: برج صافيتا, Burj Safita or Safita Tower) is a medieval structure in Safita, western Syria. It was built by the Knights Templar during the Crusades upon prior fortifications. Located on the middle hill of Safita's three hills, it offers a commanding view of the surrounding countryside, and was a major part of the network of Crusader fortifications in the area. From the roof, a view ranging see from the Mediterranean Sea to the snow-covered mountains of Lebanon, and County of Tripoli, is offered. From Chastel Blanc ("White Castle") it would have been possible to see the Templar strongholds at Tartus and Ruad Island to the northwest, Chastel Rouge on the coastline to the southwest, Akkar to the south, and Krak des Chevaliers (the headquarters of the Syrian Knights Hospitallers) to the southeast.

== History ==
The region was initially controlled by the Crusaders by 1110, and was mentioned the first time in an Arab chronicle in 1112. The Knights Templar built a dungeon after 1117, then they possessed the tower by 1152. Later on, the tower was attacked by Nur ad-Din in 1167, to be recaptured by the Templars in the same year, and was rebuilt after the 1170 earthquake, then in 1188 after Saladin's invasion, and after the 1202 earthquake. The tower was eventually captured and destroyed by Baibars in 1271.

The tower served both as a chapel and a fortress, with 3 metres (9.8 ft) thick walls constructed of massive and carefully fitted limestone blocks. The ground floor still contains a chapel, dedicated to St. Michael and used by the Greek Orthodox community of Safita. The second floor, which can be reached by a flight of partially destroyed stairs, served as a dormitory, and contains many small angled windows that were used by archers to defend the tower. Cut into the rock below the tower is a water cistern and a former weapons cache, essential elements in case of siege.

From the other fortifications of the castle, only a portal at 45 metres (148 ft) to the east of the keep can still be seen today. During the French Mandate for Syria and the Lebanon, efforts were made to restore the tower, causing great discomfort to the villagers that lived very close to it.

In 1946, when the castle's keep threatened to collapse, architect Pierre Coupel undertook an intensive programme of repairs.

== Structure ==
The structure base dates back to the Phoenician era. However, the tower visible today is the remaining keep of the original castle. It has a height of 28 metres (92 ft), a width of 18 metres (59 ft), and a length of 31 metres (102 ft). A large bell is on the western wall, and its sound can be heard up to 5 kilometres (3.1 mi) from Safita. The castle had to be restored in 1170 and 1202 following damages due to earthquakes. The keep in its current shape probably dates from the reconstruction after 1202.

== Gallery ==
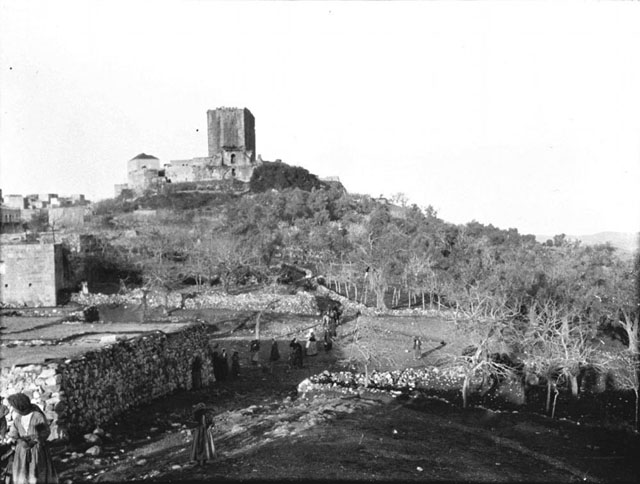
Chastel Blanc as it appeared in 1905 (photographed by Gertrude Bell)

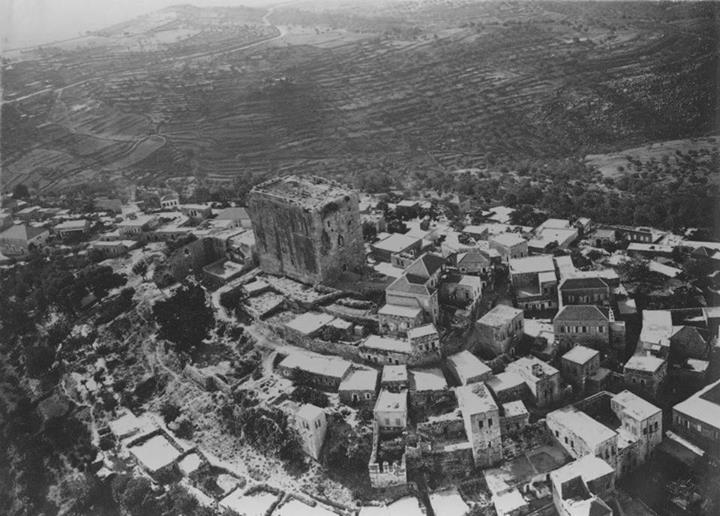
Chastel Blanc circa 1935, by Pierre Antoine Berrurier

== See also ==
- List of castles in Syria
- List of Crusader castles

== Bibliography ==
- Boas, Adrian (2006), Archaeology of the Military Orders: A Survey of the Urban Centres, Rural Settlements and Castles of the Military Orders in the Latin East (c.1120-1291), Routledge, ISBN 9781134422845.
- Murray, Alan V. (2015), The Crusades to the Holy Land: The Essential Reference Guide, ABC-CLIO, ISBN 9781610697804.
