= Buwaydat al-Suwayqat =

Buwaydat al-Suwayqat بويضة السويقات
- Village
- Location in Syria
- Coordinates: 34°48′0″N 36°3′20″E
- Country: Syria
- Governorate: Tartus
- District: Safita
- Subdistrict: Safita

Population 2004 census
  - Total: 2,835

Buwaydat al-Suwayqat (Arabic: بويضة السويقات, also spelled Bweidat al-Sweiqat) is a village in northwestern Syria, administratively part of the Tartus Governorate. It is located between Safita (to the east) and Ras al-Khashufah (to the west). According to the Syria Central Bureau of Statistics, (CBS) Buwaydat al-Suwayqat had a population of 2,835 in the 2004 census. Its inhabitants are predominantly Alawites.
