= Duwayr Taha =

Duwayr Taha دوير طه
- Village
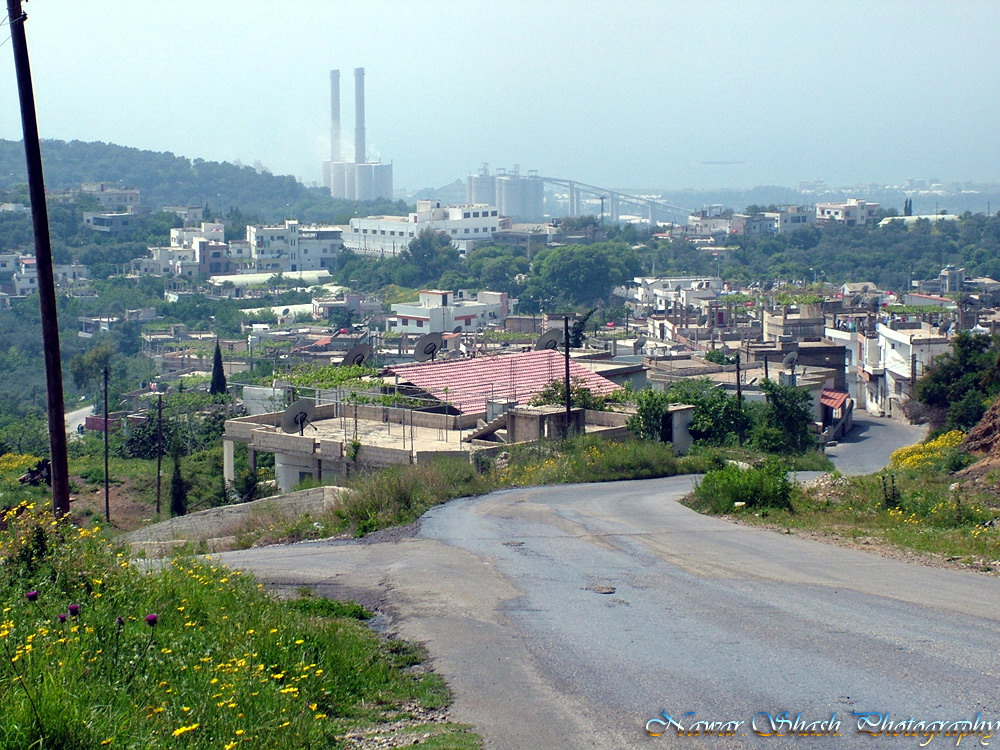
- Skyline of the village

- Location in Syria
- Coordinates: 34°58′15″N 35°55′0″E
- Country: Syria
- Governorate: Tartus
- District: Tartus
- Subdistrict: Al-Sawda Nahiyah

Population 2004 census
  - Total: 1,714

Duwayr Taha (Arabic: دوير طه, also spelled Dweir Taha or Dwerta) is a village in northwestern Syria, administratively part of the Tartus Governorate. It is situated near the Mediterranean coast. According to the Syria Central Bureau of Statistics (CBS), Duwayr Taha had a population of 1,714 in the 2004 census. Its inhabitants are predominantly Greek Orthodox Christians.

== History ==
Duwayr Taha became part of the municipality of al-Sawda in 1975, but later gained independent municipal status.
