= Halim Barakat =

Syrian novelist (1933–2023)

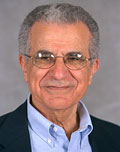
Dr. Halim Barakat, writer and sociologist

Halim Barakat (Arabic: حليم بركات December 4, 1933 - June 22, 2023) was a Syrian American novelist and sociologist. He was born into a Greek-Orthodox Arab family in Kafroun, Syria, and raised in Beirut.

== Career ==
Barakat received his bachelor's degree in sociology in 1955, and his master's degree in 1960 in the same field. He received both from the American University of Beirut. He received his PhD in social psychology in 1966 from the University of Michigan at Ann Arbor. From 1966 until 1972 he taught at the American University of Beirut. He then served as research fellow at Harvard University from 1972 to 1973, and taught at the University of Texas at Austin in 1975-1976. From 1976 until 2002 he was Teaching Research Professor at the Center for Contemporary Arab Studies of Georgetown University.

Barakat has written about twenty books and fifty essays on society and culture in journals such as the British Journal of Sociology, the Middle East Journal, Mawakif, and al-Mustaqbal al-Arabi. His publications are primarily concerned with difficulties facing modern Arab societies such as alienation, crises of civil society, and a need for identity, freedom and justice. He has also published seven novels and a collection of short stories. These are rich with symbolism and allegory to world events. His novel Six Days (Sitat Ayam, 1961) is prophetically named for a real war yet to come in 1967; as such, it became a prelude to the later novel Days of Dust ('Awdat al-Ta'ir ila al-Bahr, 1969), which unfolds the existential drama of the June War of 1967.
