= Saadallah Wannous =

Syrian playwright

- Native name: سعد الله ونوس
- Born: 1941 Husayn al Bahr, Tartous, Syria.
- Died: May 15, 1997 (aged 55–56)
- Occupation: Playwright, Writer

Saadallah Wannous (Arabic: سعد الله ونوس) was a Syrian playwright, writer and editor on Arabic theater. He was born into an Alawite family in the village of Hussein al-Bahr, near Tartous, where he received his early education. He studied journalism in Cairo, Egypt and later served as editor of the art and cultural sections of the Syrian official newspaper Al-Baath and the Lebanese daily As-Safir. For many years, he was also director of the department for music and theater in the Ministry for Culture and National Guidance of Syria.

In the late 1960s, he traveled to Paris where he studied theater and encountered various currents, trends, and schools of European theater. His career as a playwright had begun in the early Sixties with several short, one-act plays, characterized by his fundamental theme: the relationship between the individual and society and its authorities.

== Career ==
In the late 1960s, triggered by the Arab defeat of the 1967 war with Israel, political Arabic theater was born. The defeat resulted in the creation of a new level of awareness among artists and intellectuals, particularly toward the government-controlled mass media and its infiltration of popular culture. In 1969, joined by a group of playwrights, Wannous called for an Arab Festival for Theater Arts to be hosted in Damascus, later realized and attended by dramatists from all over the Arab world. In this festival, he introduced his new project: A "theater of politicization" to replace the traditional "political theater." He intended theater to play a more active role in the process of social and political change. His plays include Elephant, the King of All Times (1969), The King is the King (1977) and Hanthala's Journey from Slumber to Consciousness (1978). His 1968 play entitled Haflat samar min ajl 5 Huzayrān (An Evening Party for the Fifth of June) was noted as among the best Arabic responses to the 1967 war.

In the late 1970s, Wannous helped establish and later taught at the Higher Institute of Dramatic Arts in Damascus. He also started the magazine Theater Life (Hayyat al-masrahiya), of which he was editor-in-chief for years. In 1982, in the aftermath of the Israeli siege and invasion of Beirut, he lived through a period of shock and ceased to write for a decade. Back to writing in the early 1990s, Wannous delivered to Arabic theater a series of plays no less political than his earlier ones, starting with The Rape (1990), a play about the Arab-Israeli conflict. Afterwards, he wrote Fragments from History (1994), Rituals of Signs and Transformations (1994), Miserable Dreams (1995), A Day of Our Time (1995), and finally Mirage Epic (1996).

In 1996, he was invited by UNESCO and the International Institute of Theater to present that year's address to the world theater community during its celebration of International Theater Day on March 27. This was the first invitation for an Arab writer since the organization started this tradition in 1963.

In 2014, his plays Rituals of Signs and Transformations, An Evening Party for the Fifth of June, The Adventure of the Head of Mamluk Jaber, and The Drunken Days were published in English by the Martin E. Segal Theatre Center. Another English edition of these plays with speeches, essays and interviews with the author was published by Yale University Press as Sentence to Hope: A Sa'dallah Wannous Reader in 2019.

== Personal life ==
His daughter Dima Wannous is a journalist and literary writer who left Syria for exile in the United Kingdom.

== Death ==
On May 15, 1997, Wannous died of cancer, a disease he had battled for five years.

== Selected works ==
- An Evening Party for the Fifth of June,(1968)
- The Elephant, Oh King of the Time, (1969).
- The King is the King, (1977).
- Hanthala's Journey from Slumber to Consciousness, (1978).
- The Rape, (1989).
- Fragments from History, (1994).
- Rituals of Signs and Transformations, (1994).
- Miserable Dreams (1995).
- A Day of Our Time (1995).
- Mirage Epic (1996).
- The Adventure of Mamluk Jaber's Head
- The Drunken Days

== See also ==
- List of Syrians
- List of playwrights
- Syrian literature - Theatre and screenplays
