= Ayn al-Shams =

Ayn al-Shams عين الشمس
- Village
- Location in Syria
- Coordinates: 34.93199°N 36.275609°E
- Country: Syria
- Governorate: Hama
- District: Masyaf
- Subdistrict: Ayn Halaqim

Population (2004)
  - Total: 2,327
- Time zone: UTC+3 (AST)

Ayn al-Shams (Arabic: عين الشمس) is a village in northern Syria, administratively part of the Hama Governorate, located in Homs Gap southwest of Hama. Nearby localities include Ayn Halaqim, Nisaf and Baarin to the east, and Mashta al-Helu and al-Kafrun to the south. According to the Syria Central Bureau of Statistics, Ayn al-Shams had a population of 2,327 in the 2004 census.
