= Al-Kafrun =

Al-Kafrun الكفرون Kafroun
- Village
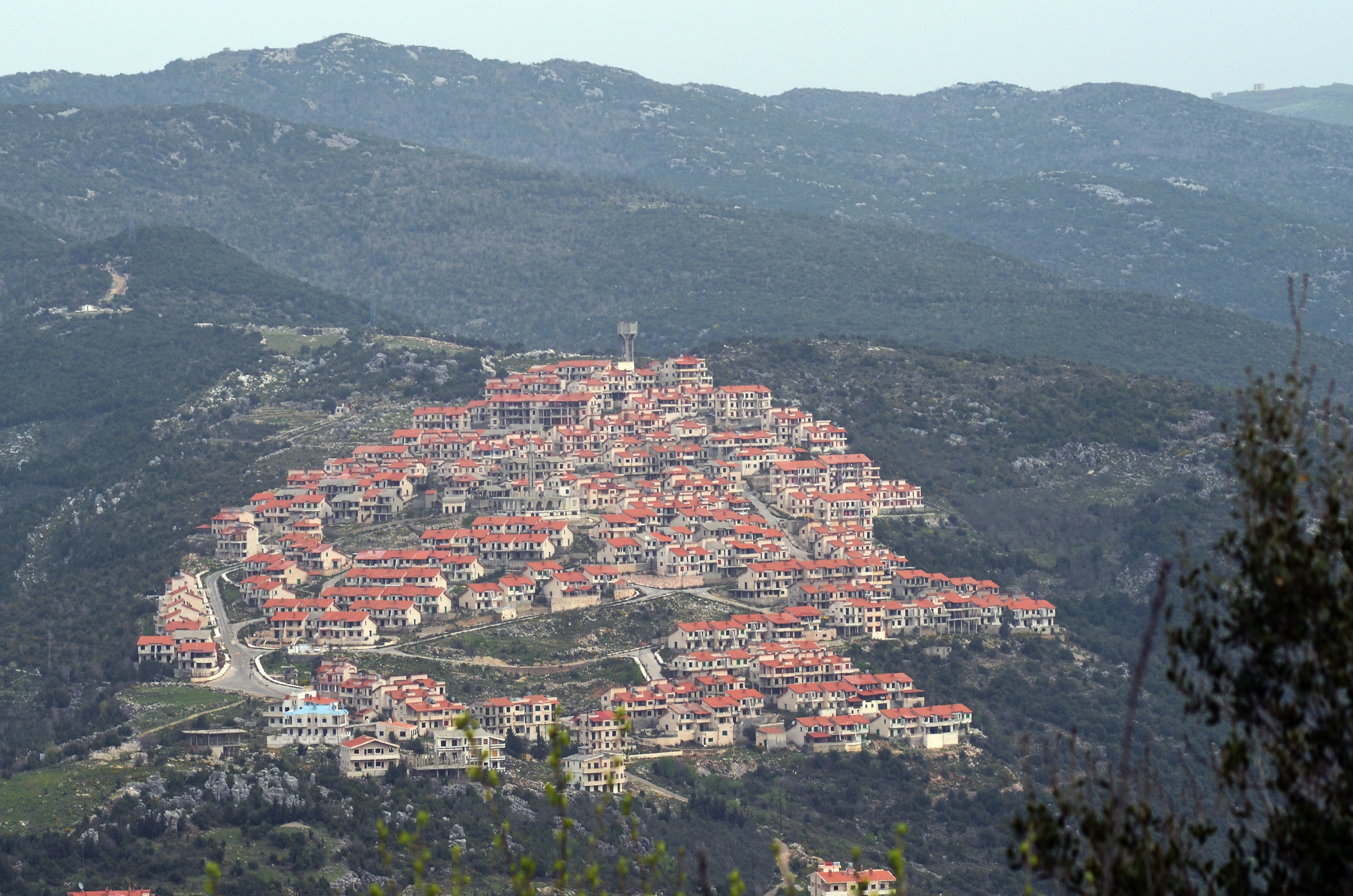
- Kafroun general view

- Location in Syria
- Coordinates: 34°51′44″N 36°14′8″E
- Country: Syria
- Governorate: Tartus
- District: Safita
- Subdistrict: Mashta al-Helu
- Elevation: 550 m (1,800 ft)

Population (2004 census)
  - Total: 485
- Time zone: UTC+3 (EET)
  - Summer (DST): UTC+2 (EEST)

Al-Kafrun (Arabic: الكفرون; also spelled Kafroun) is a village in northwestern Syria, administratively part of the Safita District of the Tartous Governorate. It is situated in the an-Nusayriyah Mountains at 550 metres (1,800 ft) above sea level. It is traditionally a summer resort for locals who want to escape the hot summer temperatures in the lowlands. According to the Syria Central Bureau of Statistics (CBS), Kafroun had a population of 485 in the 2004 census.

Its inhabitants are predominantly Greek Orthodox Christians. Al-Kafrun is among five villages in its immediate vicinity bearing this name (the others include Kafrun Badra, Kafrun Haydar, Kafrun Bashur). While Kafrun's inhabitants are Greek Orthodox, the other villages are each inhabited by a different religious group (Maronite, Melkite and Alawite).

Al-Kafrun is well known in the area for the annual festival in celebration of the Assumption/Dormition of Mary on 15 August, held atop the Jabal al-Saideh mountain. Al-Kafrun is the birthplace of the famous Syrian singer George Wassouf, and the novelist Halim Barakat.

== Sources ==
- Balanche, Fabrice (2000). "Les Alaouites, l'espace et le pouvoir dans la région côtière syrienne : une intégration nationale ambiguë" (in French). Tours: Université François Rabelais.
- Batatu, Hanna (1999). Syria's Peasantry, the Descendants of Its Lesser Rural Notables, and Their Politics. Princeton University Press. ISBN 0691002541.
