= Jenin, Syria =

Jenin جنين
- Location in Syria
- Coordinates: 34°53′37″N 36°15′9″E
- Country: Syria
- Governorate: Tartus
- District: Safita
- Subdistrict: Mashta al-Helu

Population (2004)
  - Total: 896
- Time zone: UTC+3 (EET)
  - Summer (DST): UTC+2 (EEST)

Jenin (Arabic: جنين; also spelled Jinin) is a Syrian village in the Tartous Governorate. According to the Syria Central Bureau of Statistics (CBS), Jenin had a population of 896 in the 2004 census.
