= Ayn al-Dahab =

Ayn al-Dahab عين الذهب Ein al-Dahab
- Village
- Location in Syria
- Coordinates: 34°55′57″N 36°15′55″E
- Country: Syria
- Governorate: Tartus
- District: Duraykish
- Subdistrict: Dweir Ruslan

Population (2004 census)
  - Total: 665
- Time zone: UTC+3 (EET)
  - Summer (DST): UTC+2 (EEST)
- City Qrya Pcode: C5215

Ayn al-Dahab (Arabic: عين الذهب; also transliterated Ein al-Dahab) is a village in northwestern Syria, administratively part of the Duraykish District of Tartus Governorate. According to the Syria Central Bureau of Statistics (CBS), Ayn al-Dahab had a population of 665 in the 2004 census. Its inhabitants are Alawites.

== Sources ==
- Balanche, Fabrice (2000). "Les Alaouites, l'espace et le pouvoir dans la région côtière syrienne : une intégration nationale ambiguë" (in French). Tours: Université François Rabelais.
