= Ayn al-Tineh al-Gharbiyah =

Ayn al-Tineh al-Gharbiyah عين التينة الغربية
- Village
- Location in Syria
- Coordinates: 34°42′7″N 36°13′33″E
- Country: Syria
- Governorate: Homs
- District: Talkalakh
- Subdistrict: Talkalakh

Population (2004)
  - Total: 1,092
- Time zone: UTC+2 (EET)
  - Summer (DST): +3

'Ayn al-Tineh al-Gharbiyah (Arabic: عين التينة الغربية, also known as Ayn al-Tineh) is a village in northern Syria located west of Homs in the Homs Governorate. According to the Syria Central Bureau of Statistics, 'Ayn al-Tineh al-Gharbiyah had a population of 1,092 in the 2004 census. Its inhabitants are predominantly Alawites.

== Bibliography ==
- Smith, Eli; Robinson, Edward (1841). Biblical Researches in Palestine, Mount Sinai and Arabia Petraea: A Journal of Travels in the Year 1838. Vol. 3. Crocker and Brewster.
