= Mashta al-Helu =

Town in northwestern Syria

Mashta al-Helou مشتى الحلو
- Town
- Mashta al-Helou
- Location in Syria
- Coordinates: 34°52′35″N 36°15′25″E
- Country: Syria
- Governorate: Tartus
- District: Safita
- Subdistrict: Mashta al-Helou
- Elevation: 465 m (1,526 ft)

Population (2004)
  - Total: 2,458

Mashta al-Helou (Arabic: مشتى الحلو, also known as Mashta al-Helu or Mashta al-Helo) is a town and resort in northwestern Syria, administratively part of the Tartus Governorate, located 35 kilometers east of Tartus. Mashta al-Helou is situated in a verdant area on the eastern slopes of the an-Nusayriyah Mountains, the Syrian coastal mountain range, close to where the mountain give way to the basaltic plateaur of Jabal al-Helou. The town has an elevation of 465 meters (1,526 ft) above sea level. Nearby localities include Kafrun to the west, al-Malloua and al-Bariqiyah to the southwest, Habnamrah and Marmarita to the south, Hadiya to the southeast, Kafr Ram to the east, Ayn Halaqim to the northeast, Ayn al-Shams to the north and Duraykish to the northwest.

According to the Syria Central Bureau of Statistics (CBS), Mashta al-Helou had a population of 2,458 in the 2004 census. It is the administrative center of the Mashta al-Helou nahiya (subdistrict) of the Safita District which contained 19 localities with a collective population of 12,577 in 2004. Its inhabitants are predominantly Christians, mainly belonging to the Greek Orthodox Church, or Maronite Church.

The town was founded by Christian families from different parts of Ottoman Syria (including modern Lebanon) who gradually settled in the site in the 18th and early 19th centuries, during Ottoman rule. The town modernized and became mostly literate long before many of the rural communities of the coastal mountains. Schools were opened by American, European and Russian missions in the late 19th century and a silk mill was built in 1855, one of the few industrial facilities in the coastal region into the 1960s. Since the 1980s, Mashta al-Helou has become a major summer resort town in the area and derives most of its income from tourism.

== History ==
=== Ottoman period ===
According to a book about the village penned by one of its residents, Michel Aji, the village was founded by Elias Maalouf in 1727 after he fled from his ancestral village of Kafarakab (in modern Lebanon) for killing someone there in a blood feud. The area where the village was established was then known as Mashta Troush Hasan for the landowner of nearby Uyun al-Wadi, Hasan Agha al-Turkmani, who camped his livestock at Mashta for the winter and sheltered Elias in his home at Uyun al-Wadi. Elias became known as 'al-Aji' because he was an orphan and initially lived alone in the village site and his descendants took on this epithet as the family name.

Other Christian families steadily migrated to Mashta. In 1730 the Msallam family from Zahle settled in the village and later became known as the Sous clan. The Helou family arrived in 1742 from Nabe Karkar and originally from Ayn Hilya near Zabadani. Part of the Haddad or Zeirik family settled there in 1763, the other part settling in nearby Jenin, having originally come from Jobar and the Hauran. The Nassar family arrived in 1772 from Deir Atiyah, the Sabbaghs from Palestine in 1791, the Bitar and Khoury families in 1823 and 1830 from Ayn al-Dahab, and the Awki-Hannoush family from Daghlah in 1823.

As in Mount Lebanon, olive and mulberry growing spread in Mashta al-Helou and nearby Safita and Uyun al-Wadi in the 19th century, with mulberry trees raised for silk worm cultivation. Silk mills opened in the area and the mill in Mashta was opened in 1855 by Philip Faroun from Mount Lebanon. It was sold to a French company in 1875. In 1880, an American Evangelical school was opened in the village. Six years later, the Jesuits opened a school in Beit Sarkis. In 1896 the Russian Orthodox Church opened a missionary school, the Palestinian Imperial Commission, in Mashta, which closed in 1917 then reopened as a government school under French Mandatory rule in 1920 and eventually became a secondary school.

=== French Mandatory period ===
The American school closed in 1947. The first high schools opened in 1949 and 1951, the first operated by the Syrian Communist Party and the second opened by the Syrian Social Nationalist Party. The SSNP school was shut down after the assassination of the Ba'athist military officer Adnan al-Malki by the SSNP.

=== Post-Syrian independence ===
Before the Ba'ath Party gained power in Syria in the 1960s, Mashta al-Helou was one of a few villages in the coastal mountain region that was electrified and connected to a grid, and one of the few with resident doctors. The silk mill in the village was one of the only industrial facilities in the coastal region. When these facilities were slated to be nationalized in 1963–1965, the mill was sold to a Syrian businessman from Homs, Antoine Samman, and was later purchased by the Nassar family of Mashta al-Helou, who closed the mill in 1970. In the 1980s and 1990s popular summer resorts began to be built in Mashta al-Helou. A luxury hotel was built in the village by entrepreneur Saheb Nahhas. Tourism has become the primary source of income in Mashta al-Helou.

== Beit Sarkis ==
In 1735 the Baisari family from Hadshit (in modern Lebanon) settled in Mashta and eventually took up abode on a nearby hill, which became a hamlet called Beit Sarkis after a monk from the family named Sarkis. The home Sarkis built became the Maronite Church of Beit Sarkis. In 1960 Beit Sarkis was listed as its own village with a population of 223. In 1962, the Catholic newspaper The Criterion reported the village had 200 impoverished parishioners, many of whom were unemployed, and in need of funds to repair the Church of Beit Sarkis. The population of Beit Sarkis in 1994 was 157. and at a later point the village was incorporated into the Mashta al-Helou municipality. A notable resident of Beit Sarkis was Ramez Sarkis, a prominent real estate developer and civic leader who served as the mayor of Mashta al-Helou until his passing on November 15, 2020. Though small in size, Beit Sarkis has produced many notable individuals who have since emigrated to the United States, Canada, Europe, and elsewhere. Despite living abroad, many members of the diaspora return annually during the summer months to visit family and maintain strong ties to the village.

== Churches ==
The old church of Mashta al-Helou, the Church of St. Elias, was built by Ibrahim al-Sabbagh in 1843. The second oldest church, Saydeh Church, in the town was founded by Askandra Hanna al-Haddad following her return from Jerusalem in 1890. It was completed in 1898, with its dome installed two years later.

== Sources ==
- Aji, Michel Ghosn (2019). Mashta Al Helou - A Village Tale. ISBN 978-9933-18-861-0.
- Balanche, Fabrice (2000). "Les Alaouites, l'espace et le pouvoir dans la région côtière syrienne : une intégration nationale ambiguë" (in French). Tours: Université François Rabelais.
- Balanche, Fabrice (2006). La région alaouite et le pouvoir syrien (PDF) (in French). Karthala Editions. ISBN 2845868189.
