= Kafr Fo =

Kafr Fo كفرفو
- Village
- Location in Syria
- Coordinates: 34°42′56″N 36°5′3″E
- Country: Syria
- Governorate: Tartus
- District: Tartus District
- Subdistrict: al-Safsafah Subdistrict

Population (2004)
  - Total: 2,213
- Time zone: UTC+3 (EET)
  - Summer (DST): UTC+2 (EEST)
- City Qrya Pcode: C5335

Kafr Fo (Arabic: كفرفو) is a Syrian village in the Tartus District in Tartus Governorate. According to the Syria Central Bureau of Statistics (CBS), Kafr Fo had a population of 2,213 in the 2004 census.
