= Maten al-Sahel =

Maten al-Sahel متن الساحل
- Village
- Maten al-Sahel
- Location within Syria
- Coordinates: 35.0004°N 35.9220°E
- Country: Syria
- Governorate: Tartus
- District: Tartus
- Subdistrict: Sawda

Population (2004 census)
  - Total: 2,101
- Time zone: UTC+2 (EET)
  - Summer (DST): UTC+3 (EEST)

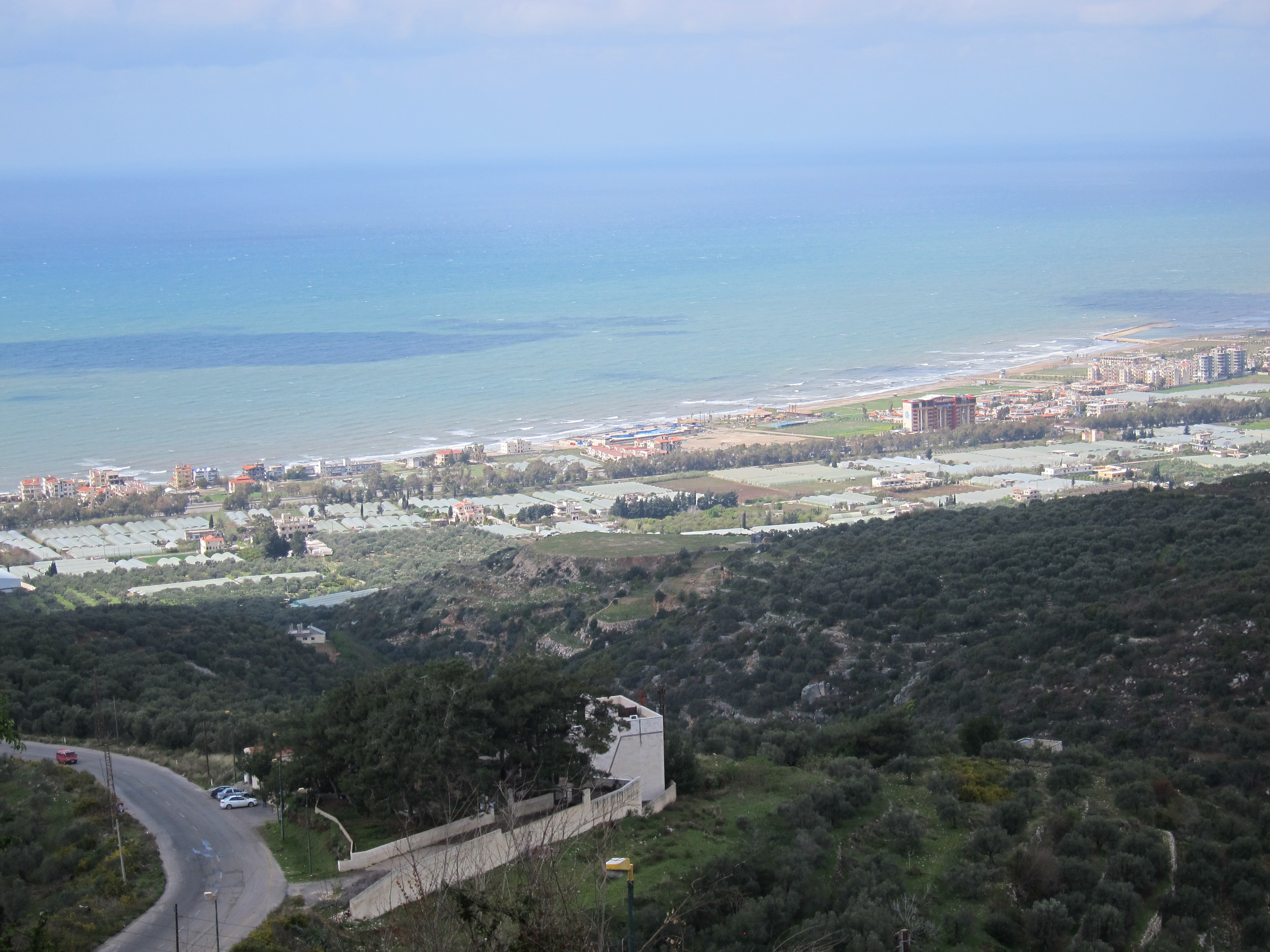
Coastal view from mountain top. By Sammer.

Maten al-Sahel (Arabic: متن الساحل), is a village in Tartus Governorate, northwestern Syria

the Syrian government renamed the village Maten al-Sahel, "Coast". This village is located 280 km north-west of Damascus, near the Mediterranean coast. According to the Syria Central Bureau of Statistics, Maten al-Sahel had a population of 2,101 in the 2004 census. The majority of the population are members of the Eastern Orthodox Christian community, with an Alawite Muslim minority.

== Geography ==
Maten al-Sahel is situated on the top of mountain about 300 m above the level of the sea and overlooks the coastal lands from the western side of the town with a view. The distance from the Tartus-Lattakia highway is 4 km and it is reached by mountainous road between olive tree fields. The village is surrounded by valleys, and there are many roads across these valleys and mountains that are used for activities such as walking and cycling particularly in the spring.

=== Prices ===
- Taxi's fee from Damascus Airport to the Bus Station: $15
- Bus Ticket from Damascus to Tartus (300 km, 3hours) by Al-Kadmous Company: $3
- Car from Tartus to Almaten: $3
- Private mini-bus directly from Damascus Airport to Maten al-Sahel (with town's private cars): $60
- Private mini-bus for a daily trip: from $65

== Demographics and services ==
The area around al-Maten is known to have been settled since the 18th century. Total population of al-Maten is about 3,500. The educational level in al-Maten is extremely high as the percentage of the illiteracy among the new generation is almost 0%, and the most of population are holding high degrees. al-Maten has all the requirements of modern life such as electrical networks, phones, mobile coverage, health center, and a developing transport system including two buses and many private cars and mini-buses.

== Economy ==
The main industries in al-Maten are: agriculture, government, and immigration. Agriculture is the traditional job in al-Maten. More than 90% of the population depends on it as the main source of income. Tomatoes in green houses and olive oil are the most important crops produced in al-Maten.

== Climate ==
The climate is temperate and Mediterranean with hot, dry summers (maximum temperature 36 °C) and cool, variably rainy winters (minimum temperature 0 °C).
