= Jinín =

- Municipality
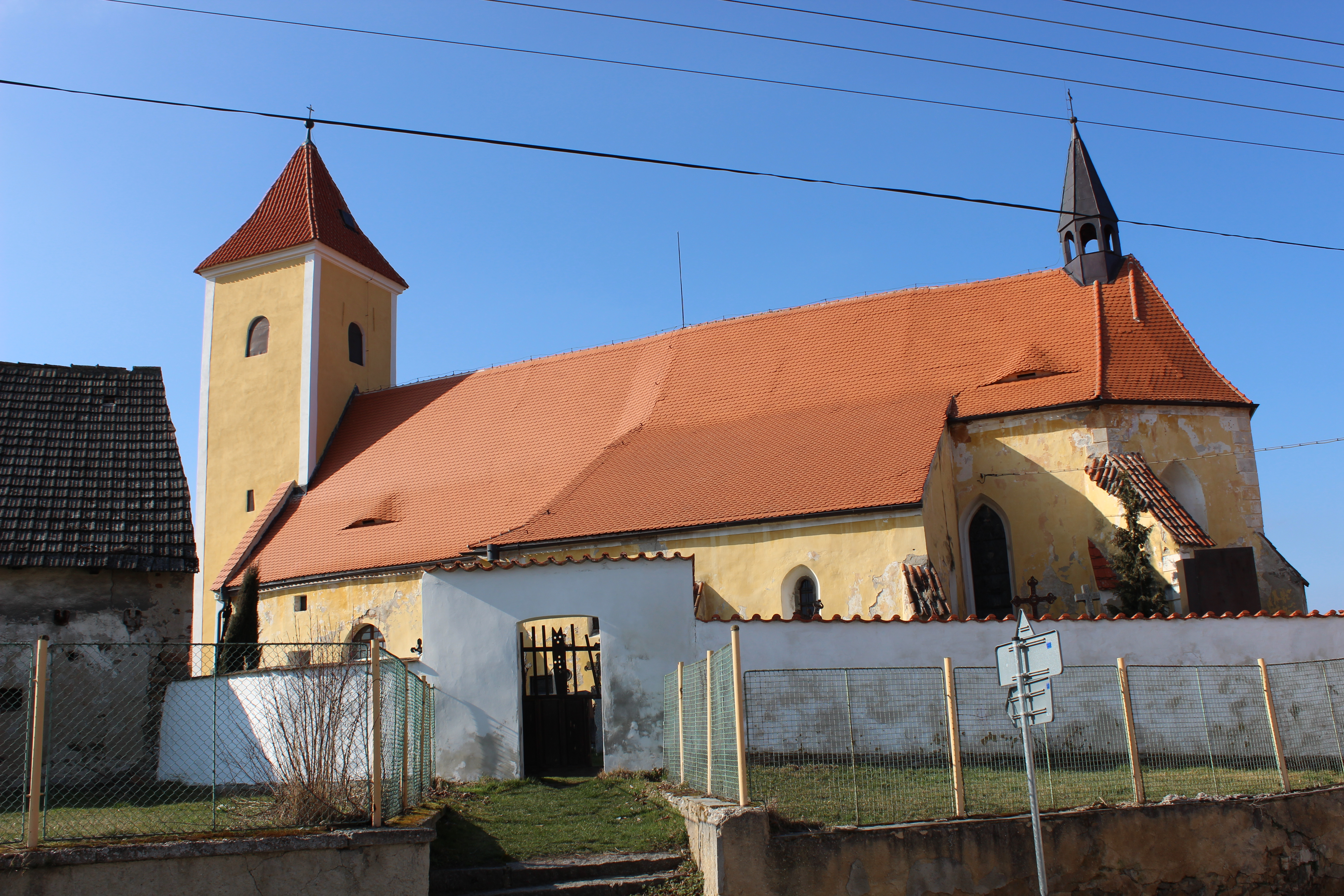
- Church of the Assumption of the Virgin Mary

- Location in the Czech Republic
- Coordinates: 49°13′40″N 13°58′57″E
- Country: Czech Republic
- Region: South Bohemian
- District: Strakonice
- First mentioned: 1279

Area
  - Total: 4.85 km^{2} (1.87 sq mi)
- Elevation: 545 m (1,788 ft)

Population (2026-01-01)
  - Total: 208
  - Density: 42.9/km^{2} (111/sq mi)
- Time zone: UTC+1 (CET)
  - Summer (DST): UTC+2 (CEST)
- Postal code: 386 01
- Website: www.obec-jinin.cz

Jinín is a municipality and village in Strakonice District in the South Bohemian Region of the Czech Republic. It has about 200 inhabitants.

Jinín lies approximately 7 kilometres (4 mi) south-east of Strakonice, 46 km (29 mi) north-west of České Budějovice, and 101 km (63 mi) south of Prague.

== Demographics ==
Historical population
Year	Pop.	±%
1869	411	—
1880	429	+4.4%
1890	404	−5.8%
1900	377	−6.7%
1910	389	+3.2%
1921	388	−0.3%
1930	350	−9.8%
1950	291	−16.9%
1961	279	−4.1%
1970	217	−22.2%
1980	206	−5.1%
1991	196	−4.9%
2001	192	−2.0%
2011	170	−11.5%
2021	210	+23.5%
Source: Censuses
