= Al-Bariqiyah =

Village in northwestern Syria

Al-Bariqiyah البارقية Barqieh
- Village
- Location in Syria
- Coordinates: 34°49′39″N 36°13′26″E
- Country: Syria
- Governorate: Tartus
- District: Safita
- Subdistrict: Bariqiyah

Population (2004)
  - Total: 3,627

Al-Bariqiyah (Arabic: البارقية, also spelled Barqieh) is a village in northwestern Syria, administratively part of the Tartus Governorate, located southeast of Tartus. It is situated between Safita to the west, Mashta al-Helu to the north and the Wadi al-Nasara area to the south. According to the Syria Central Bureau of Statistics (CBS), al-Bariqiyah had a population of 3,627 in the 2004 census. It is the administrative center of the al-Bariqiyah Subdistrict, which consists of eight localities with a total population of 7,336. Its inhabitants are predominantly Alawites.
