= Al-Juwaykhat =

Al-Juwaykhat الجويخات
- Village
- Location in Syria
- Coordinates: 34°52′21″N 36°17′49″E
- Country: Syria
- Governorate: Homs
- District: Homs
- Subdistrict: Shin

Population (2004)
  - Total: 375
- Time zone: UTC+3 (AST)
- City Qrya Pcode: C2698

Al-Juwaykhat (Arabic: الجويخات) is a village in Syria in the Homs District, Homs Governorate. According to the Syria Central Bureau of Statistics, al-Juwaykhat had a population of 375 in the 2004 census. Its inhabitants are predominantly Christians.
