= Ayn al-Tineh al-Sharqiyah =

Ayn al-Tineh al-Sharqiyah عين التينة الشرقية
- Village
- Location in Syria
- Coordinates: 34°40′38″N 36°23′23″E
- Country: Syria
- Governorate: Homs
- District: Talkalakh
- Subdistrict: Hadidah

Population (2004)
  - Total: 1,135
- Time zone: UTC+2 (EET)
  - Summer (DST): +3

'Ayn al-Tineh al-Sharqiyah (Arabic: عين التينة الشرقية; also known simply as Ayn al-Tineh) is a village in northern Syria located west of Homs in the Homs Governorate. According to the Syria Central Bureau of Statistics, 'Ayn al-Tineh al-Sharqiyah had a population of 1,135 in the 2004 census. Its inhabitants are predominantly Alawites.

== Bibliography ==
- Smith, Eli; Robinson, Edward (1841). Biblical Researches in Palestine, Mount Sinai and Arabia Petraea: A Journal of Travels in the Year 1838. Vol. 3. Crocker and Brewster.
