= Al-Annazah, Tartus District =

Al-Annazah العنازة
- Village
- Location in Syria
- Coordinates: 35°0′24″N 35°57′53″E
- Country: Syria
- Governorate: Tartus
- District: Tartus District
- Subdistrict: Al-Sawda

Population (2004)
  - Total: 1,944
- Time zone: UTC+2 (EET)
  - Summer (DST): UTC+3 (EEST)
- City Qrya Pcode: C5288

Al-Annazah (Arabic: العنازة) is a Syrian village located in Tartus District, Tartus. According to the Syria Central Bureau of Statistics (CBS), Al-Annazah had a population of 1,944 in the 2004 census. Its inhabitants are all Alawites.
