= Ras al-Khashufah =

Town in northwestern Syria

Ras al-Khashufah رأس الخشوفة
- Town
- Location in Syria
- Coordinates: 34°49′34″N 36°3′32″E
- Country: Syria
- Governorate: Tartus
- District: Safita
- Subdistrict: Ras al-Khashufah

Population (2004)
  - Total: 5,499

Ras al-Khashufah (Arabic: رأس الخشوفة) is a small town in northwestern Syria, administratively part of the Tartus Governorate. It is located between Safita and Tartus. According to the Syria Central Bureau of Statistics (CBS), Ras al-Khashufah had a population of 5,499 in the 2004 census. It is the administrative center of the Ras al-Khashufaf Subdistrict (nahiyah) which consisted of 16 localities with a collective population of 21,586. Its inhabitants are predominantly Alawites.
