= Al-Shaykh Saad, Tartus Governorate =

Al-Shaykh Saad الشيخ سعد
- Village
- Location in Syria
- Coordinates: 34°54′34″N 35°55′43″E
- Country: Syria
- Governorate: Tartus
- District: Tartus District
- Subdistrict: Tartus

Population (2004)
  - Total: 4,046
- Time zone: UTC+3 (EET)
  - Summer (DST): UTC+2 (EEST)
- City Qrya Pcode: C5236

Al-Shaykh Saad (Arabic: الشيخ سعد) is a Syrian village in the Tartus District in Tartous Governorate. According to the Syria Central Bureau of Statistics (CBS), al-Shaykh Saad had a population of 4,046 in the 2004 census.

During the Syrian Civil War, a number of displaced people from various parts of the Homs Governorate took refuge in the village.
