= Dweir al-Shaykh Saad =

Dweir al-Shaykh Saad دوير الشيخ سعد
- Village
- Location in Syria
- Coordinates: 34°55′40″N 35°55′50″E
- Country: Syria
- Governorate: Tartus
- District: Tartus District
- Subdistrict: Tartus

Population (2004)
  - Total: 4,117
- Time zone: UTC+3 (EET)
  - Summer (DST): UTC+2 (EEST)
- City Qrya Pcode: C5226

Dweir al-Shaykh Saad (Arabic: دوير الشيخ سعد) is a Syrian village in the Tartus District in Tartous Governorate. According to the Syria Central Bureau of Statistics (CBS), Dweir al-Shaykh Saad had a population of 4,117 in the 2004 census.
