= Khirbet al-Faras =

Khirbat al Faras خربة الفرس
- Village
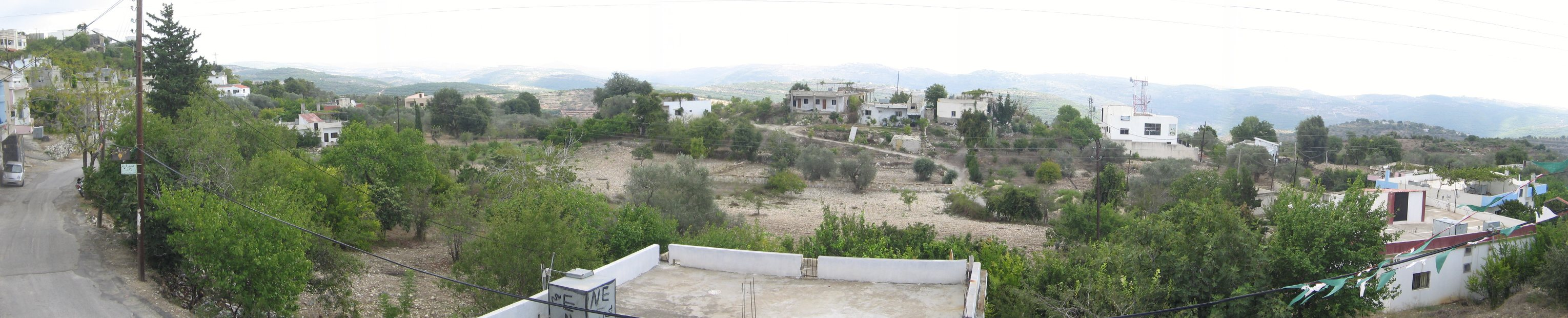
- Panoramic View of the village of Khirbet al-Faras

- Location in Syria
- Coordinates: 34°57′3.62″N 36°0′48.66″E
- Country: Syria
- Governorate: Tartus
- District: Tartus
- Subdistrict: Tartus

Population (2004 census)
  - Total: 1,113
- Time zone: UTC+2 (EET)
  - Summer (DST): UTC+3 (EEST)
- Area code: 43

Khirbat Al Faras (Arabic: خربة الفرس) is a Syrian city administratively belonging to Tartus Governorate located in the Khawabi region, its distance from city of Tartus about 20 km. Khirbat Al Faras has an altitude of 300 meters and surrounded by two rivers. According to the Syria Central Bureau of Statistics, Khirbet al-Faras had a population of 1,113 in the 2004 census. Its inhabitants are predominantly Ismaili.
