= Al-Sawda =

Town in northwestern Syria

Al-Sawda السودا
- Town
- Location within Syria
- Coordinates: 34°58′56″N 35°56′37″E
- Country: Syria
- Governorate: Tartus
- District: Tartus
- Subdistrict: Al-Sawda

Population (2004)
  - Total: 4,064
- Time zone: UTC+2 (EET)
  - Summer (DST): UTC+3 (EEST)

Al-Sawda (Arabic: السودا, also spelled Sauda or al-Soda) is a town in northwestern Syria, administratively part of the Tartus Governorate, located 15 kilometers northeast of Tartus. Nearby localities include Annazah to the northeast, Maten al-Sahel to the northwest, Husayn al-Baher to the west, Dweir al-Shaykh Saad to the southwest, Awaru to the south, Khirbet al-Faras to the southeast and Khawabi to the east. According to the Syria Central Bureau of Statistics, al-Sawda had a population of 4,064 in the 2004 census. It is the administrative center of the al-Sawda nahiyah ("sub-district") which contained 27 localities with a collective population of 32,925 in 2004. The inhabitants are predominantly Christians, of the Greek Orthodox Church.

== History ==
The name al-Sawda is Arabic for "The Black" or "That which is Black" which reflects upon the black basaltic stone that al-Sawda's inhabitants previously used to construct the buildings of their town, including the main church. During the late Ottoman era, basalt-based masonry served as a principal industry in al-Sawda, employing up to 400 inhabitants by the beginning of the French Mandate period. The industry declined with the advent of cement and iron construction in the region.

During the Ottoman era (1516-1918), the administrative center of the vicinity ("subdistrict") was based at the Sunni Muslim town and medieval castle of Khawabi. There are still several Ottoman-era structures as well as a church in the town. However, during the period of French Mandate rule that soon followed the Ottoman withdrawal from Syria, the center of the vicinity was moved to al-Sawda by the French authorities, because unlike Khawabi, al-Sawda's inhabitants did not participate in the 1919 Syrian Revolt led by Sheikh Salih al-Ali who hailed from the region.

During the French Mandate, al-Sawda's status overtook that of Khawabi, as people who would normally being traveling to the latter for commercial transactions went to al-Sawda instead. While Khawabi rapidly declined, al-Sawda became a dynamic center having a clinic, a secondary school and a wide range of shops. However, in 1967, during the early stages of Baathist rule in Syria, the center for the mantiqah ("district") was relocated by the Ministry of Local Affairs to al-Shaykh Badr which in 1970 had a population of 467 (and a lack of services) compared to al-Sawda's population of 1,103. Today al-Sawda is the center of a nahiyah in the Tartus District, while al-Shaykh Badr has grown to become a significantly larger town and center of the al-Shaykh Badr District.

== Bibliography ==
- Balanche, Fabrice (2006). La région alaouite et le pouvoir syrien (in French). Karthala Editions. ISBN 2845868189.
- Lee, Jess (2010). Syria Handbook. Footprint Travel Guides. ISBN 978-1907263033.
