= Safita =

- City
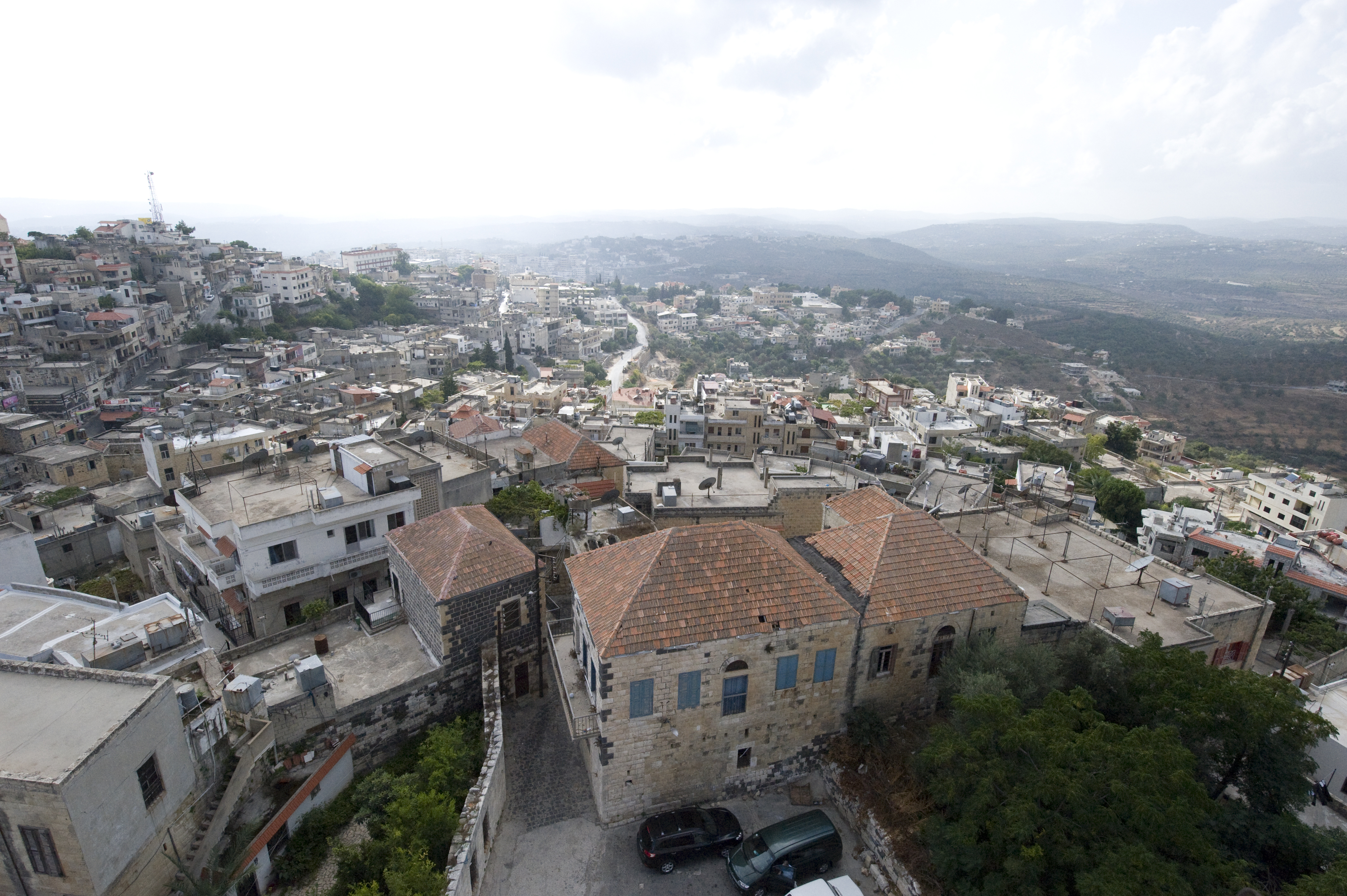
- View of Safita from the Chastel Blanc citadel

- Location in Syria
- Coordinates: 34°49′N 36°07′E
- Country: Syria
- Governorate: Tartus
- District: Safita
- Subdistrict: Safita

Population (2004)
  - Total: 20,301
- Time zone: UTC+2 (EET)
  - Summer (DST): UTC+3 (EEST)
- Area code: 43
- City Qrya Pcode: C5472

Safita (Arabic: صَافِيتَا Ṣāfītā; Phoenician: 𐤎𐤐𐤕𐤄, Sōpūte) is a city in the Tartus Governorate, western Syria, located to the southeast of Tartus and to the northwest of Krak des Chevaliers. It is situated on the tops of three hills and the valleys between them, in the Syrian Coastal Mountain Range. According to the Syria Central Bureau of Statistics (CBS), Safita had a population of 20,301 in the 2004 census. It has a religiously mixed population of mostly Greek Orthodox Christians and Alawites.

The Crusader-built fortress of Chastel Blanc in Safita enabled the city to historically dominate the surrounding region. Safita served as the center of a large rural district throughout Ottoman rule (1517–1918). Its influence receded with the administrative rise and economic development of the nearby port town of Tartus and the dimunition of its jurisdiction beginning under French Mandatory rule (1923–1946) and continuing post-Syrian independence. Safita shares close economic ties with Tartus, as well as having business networks extending across Syria's major cities and Lebanon. It remains an economic hub for the surrounding countryside.

== History ==
Safita is located on a site where remains of the Phoenician settlement were discovered. The archaeological remains at the site of Tell Kazel were identified as the Phoenician city of Sumur mentioned in the Amarna letters.

=== Crusader era ===
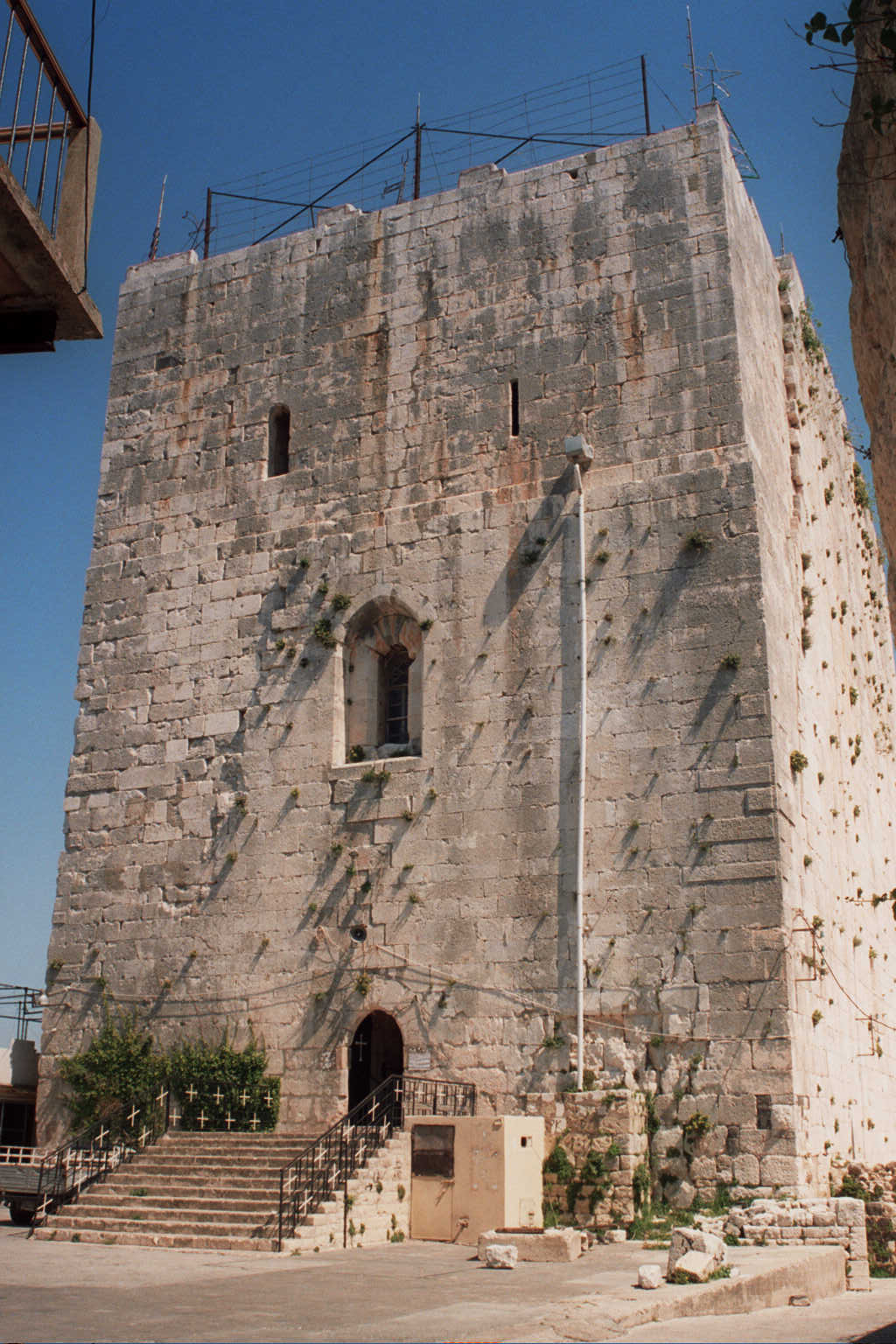
Chastel Blanc

Raymond IV, Count of Toulouse founded the County of Tripoli. The Knights Templar, to whom the lands of the region were given, built the fortress known today as the "Chastel Blanc". The fortress sits on a strategic observation point, and from there, it maintains eye contact with the network of fortresses of the Templar Order, Arwad and Tartus on the coast in the northwest, Chastel Rouge in the southwest and Krak des Chevaliers in the southeast. The Mamluk sultan Baybars captured Safita in 1271, bringing it under Muslim rule.

=== Ottoman era ===
Safita was the center of the principal nahiya (subdistrict) of the southern Syrian Coastal Mountain Range during Ottoman rule through the 16th and early 17th centuries, spanning about fifty villages and, at times, including the subdistricts of Mi'ar, Qulay'a and Tartus within its jurisdiction. The inhabitants of the nahiya were Christians and Alawites. The Sayfa dynasty, based in the hinterland of Tripoli, controlled the town until 1640, often using its fortress in their wars with the Druze Ma'n dynasty of Mount Lebanon. In 1621, the governor of Tripoli Eyalet, Yusuf Sayfa, dispatched a force against his nephew, and ally of the Ma'nid Fakhr ad-Din II, Sulayman Sayfa, in Safita for not forwarding the subdistrict's tax revenue.

After 1640, Safita is seldom mentioned in the historical chronicles of the middle Ottoman period. However, court records in Tripoli Sanjak, of which Safita was part, the earliest of which date to 1666 and 1667, indicate the iltizam (tax farms) of the Safita nahiya were sold to the Alawite brothers Muhammad ibn Shamsin and Zaydan ibn Shamsin, in 1667–1668. They were charged with collecting taxes on behalf of the government on fruit trees, agricultural lands, falcons, bees, silk, flour mills, buffalo, wave labor, festivals, weddings, and wintering camps of Turkmen and Arab nomads, as well as collecting the jizya (poll tax) from the Christian communities. The Shamsin (or Shibli) family emerged as the dominant local force of Safita at least from the late 17th century until the mid-19th century.

=== French Mandatory rule ===
Under Ottoman rule into the early 20th century, Safita served as the principal city of Syria's southern coastal mountain range by dint of its large population and its economic influence and administrative authority over a large district. Its decline began under French Mandatory rule (1923–1946), when the nearby coastal town of Tartus became a sanjak capital, diluting Safita's influence. In 1933, Safita had a population of 2,715 Christians and 280 Alawites. In 1943, Safita's population of 3,500 continued to largely consist of Greek Orthodox Christians. At the time, its houses were described as well-built and made of alternating black and white stones and clustered around the Crusader-era fortress.

=== Post-Syrian independence ===
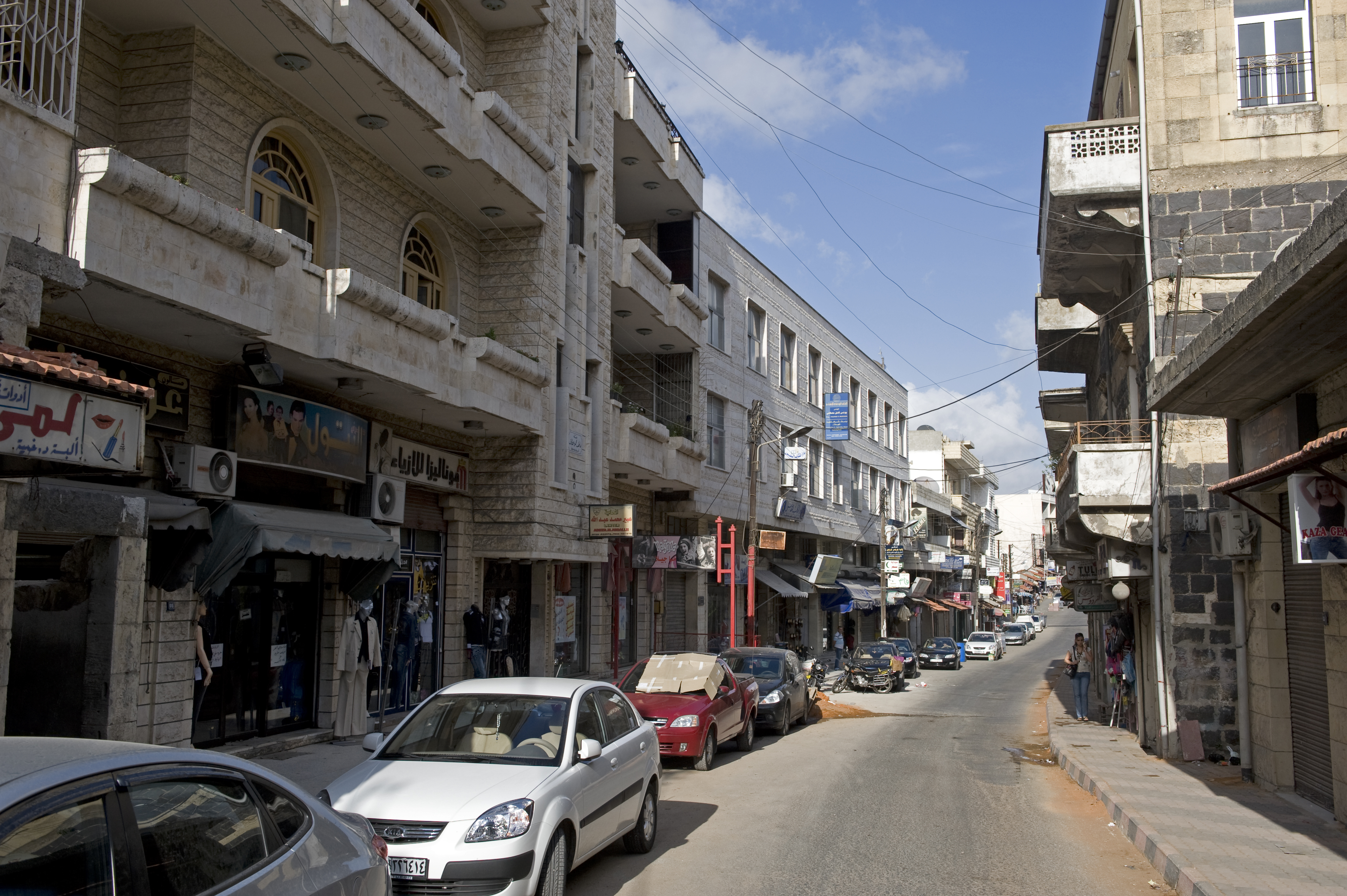
A street in the old town of Safita, 2008

Syria gained its independence in 1946. In 1960, Safita's population consisted of 4,300 Christians and 1,900 Alawites. With Tartus's elevation as the capital of a new governorate, the Tartus Governorate, in 1967, Safita's administrative subordination to Tartus was reinforced. The increased civic importance of Tartus and the construction of a major port there along with the development of irrigated commercial agriculture along the coastal plain drew more economic and civil activity away from Safita. Many Safitan entrepreneurs opened businesses in the developing port city, while maintaining their primary residences in Safita. In 1967–1970, Safita's administrative clout was further reduced when half of the Safita District was made a new district centered in the mountain town of Dreikish and the subdistrict of Safsafa was transferred to Tartus District.

As of the late 1990s, most Safitans worked in Tartus and the anthropologist Fabrice Balanche described Safita as a satellite or suburb of Tartus. At the same time, people from Safita have settled in all of Syria's major cities and in Lebanon, providing the city with a large economic network which mitigates its economic reliance on Tartus. Safita remains a commercial hub for a relatively large hinterland. Many residents from the surrounding villages open shops in the city, which also serves as a professional hub with a relatively large number of medical and legal practices and engineering businesses.

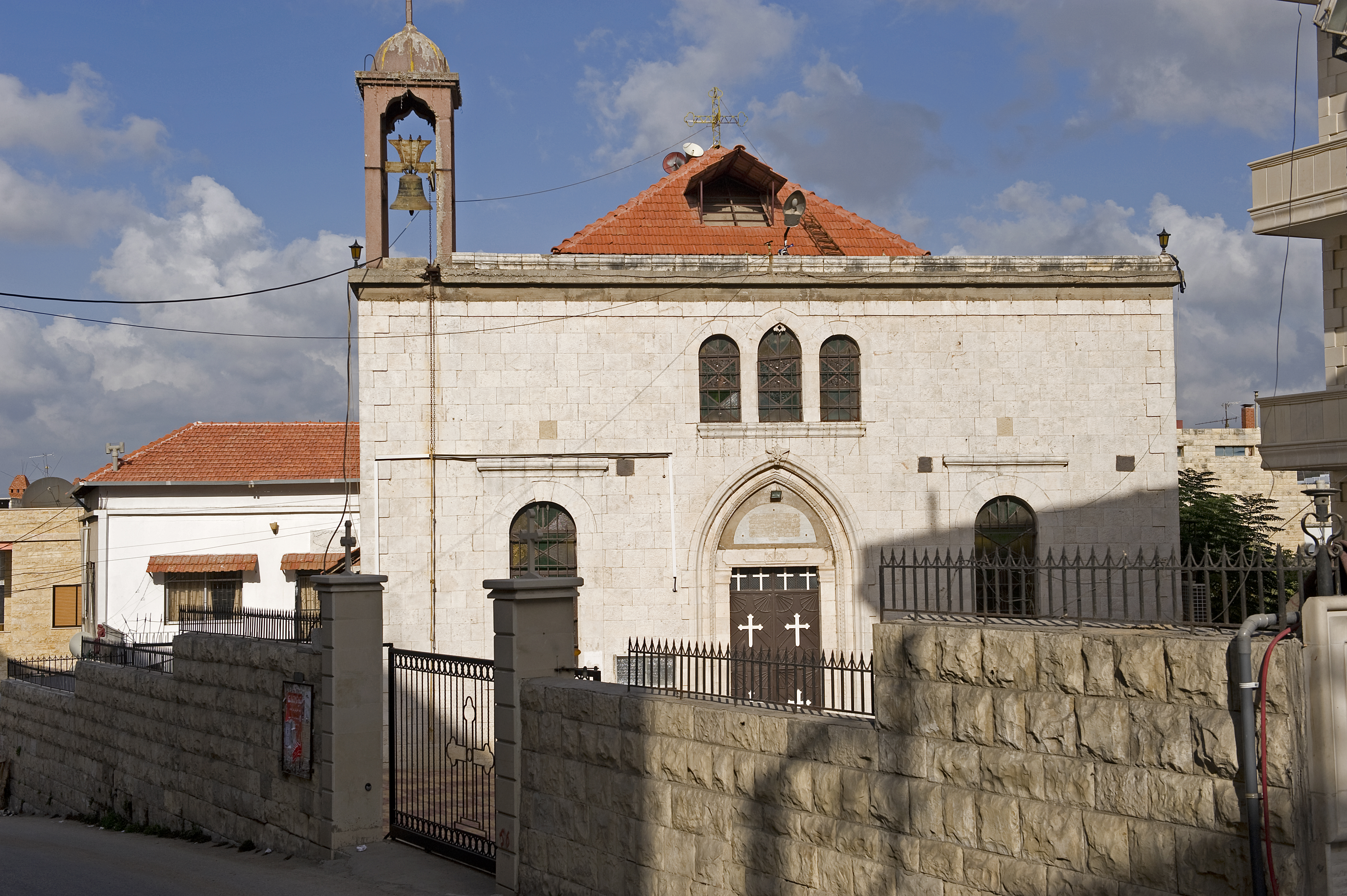
A church in Safita, 2008

Christians in the city have a lower birthrate and a higher emigration rate, while there has been a continuous migration of Alawites from the countryside to the city. Balanche surmises, based on his own observations, that Safita's old town remains mostly populated by Christians, while the city in general has a slight Alawite majority. The two communities share similar lifestyles and their relations have not been characterized by sectarian tension. The city has benefited from Christians' established economic networks and many local Alawites' connections to Syria's military and political power centers. The most influential political movements in the city since the 1950s have been the ruling Ba'ath Party and the Communist Party. The state constructed a five-star luxury hotel in Safita from the Cham hotel chain and built a modern road network, widening the Safita–Tartus and Safita–Homs highways to three lanes, in the 1990s. The villages in the Safita District are also well connected to the city and in 1994, six adjacent communities were incorpated into the Safita municipality. This has allowed the city a significantly higher fiscal allocation from the state and these subsidies have funded major municipal projects, including preservation efforts of the old town, construction of a ring road, and new or improved sewer networks and wastewater treatment.

== Geography ==
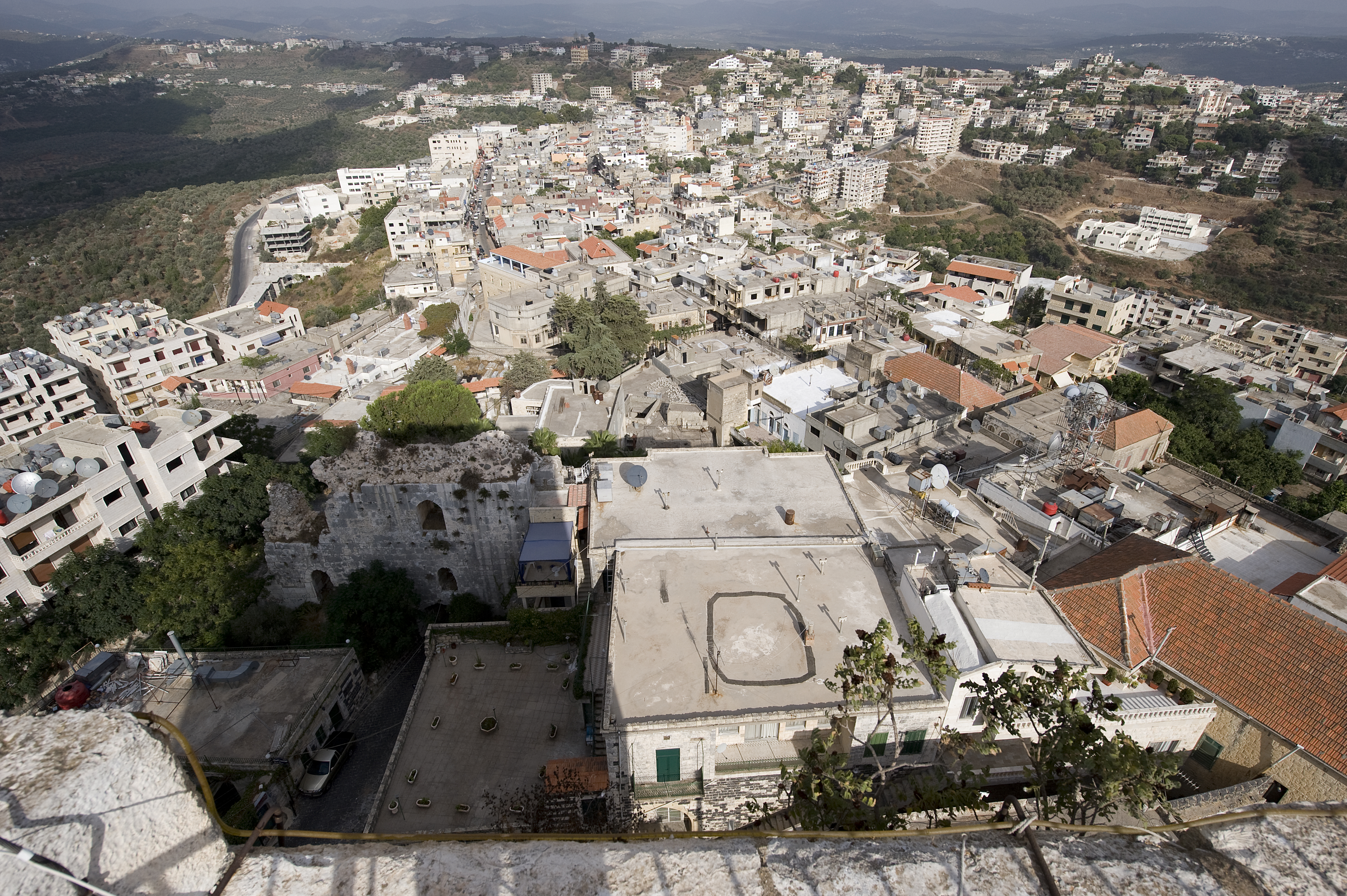
A general view of Safita and its countryside, 2008

Safita is situated at the southeastern end of the Syrian Coastal Mountain Range. It is 26 kilometers (16 mi) southeast of the Mediterranean port city of Tartus and 55 kilometers (34 mi) northwest of Homs. The average elevation of Safita is 400 meters (1,300 ft) above sea level, while the Crusader fortress stands about 720 meters (2,360 ft). The hill upon on which Safita's citadel stands had historically enabled it to dominate the surrounding region. The citadel overlooks the fortress of Margat (Marqab) to the north, the Krak des Chevaliers (al-Husn or Hisn al-Akrad) to the east and Tripoli to the south, positioning it as a relay node between the three fortresses during the medieval period.

The city sits on a crossroads that intersects the east-west highway between Tartus and Homs and the north-south highway between Safita and Dreikish. Its north-south connectivity is enabled by its geography: compared with other towns in the coastal mountains, Safita's decline is not steep (not exceeding 400 meters (1,300 ft)) and the valleys to its north and south are not cut by streams. The Safita-Dreikish road is the only north-south connection in the mountains that is frequently served by public transport.

Due to its slope landform, the surrounding rural areas to Safita are used by landowners for olive cultivation and olive oil production.

=== Climate ===
Safita has a hot-summer Mediterranean climate (Köppen Csa) with hot, dry summers and mild, wet winters. It is part of the wettest region of Syria due to the orographic effect of the coastal Mediterranean Sea mountains, receiving around 1,200 millimetres or 47 inches of rainfall per year, or about ten times as much as Damascus and four times as much as Aleppo.

Climate data for Safita, elevation 359 m (1,178 ft), (2000–2020)
Month	Jan	Feb	Mar	Apr	May	Jun	Jul	Aug	Sep	Oct	Nov	Dec	Year
Mean daily maximum °C (°F)	13.2 (55.8)	14.5 (58.1)	18.0 (64.4)	21.7 (71.1)	25.8 (78.4)	28.3 (82.9)	30.4 (86.7)	31.1 (88.0)	29.7 (85.5)	27.0 (80.6)	21.0 (69.8)	15.1 (59.2)	23.0 (73.4)
Daily mean °C (°F)	10.3 (50.5)	11.4 (52.5)	14.3 (57.7)	17.6 (63.7)	21.4 (70.5)	24.1 (75.4)	26.3 (79.3)	27.0 (80.6)	25.5 (77.9)	22.9 (73.2)	17.4 (63.3)	12.1 (53.8)	19.2 (66.5)
Mean daily minimum °C (°F)	7.4 (45.3)	8.2 (46.8)	10.7 (51.3)	13.5 (56.3)	17.0 (62.6)	19.9 (67.8)	22.2 (72.0)	22.9 (73.2)	21.4 (70.5)	18.8 (65.8)	13.8 (56.8)	9.1 (48.4)	15.4 (59.7)
Average rainfall mm (inches)	215.1 (8.47)	216.7 (8.53)	159.5 (6.28)	108.1 (4.26)	21.8 (0.86)	0.3 (0.01)	0.4 (0.02)	5.1 (0.20)	39.7 (1.56)	75.4 (2.97)	135.2 (5.32)	239.2 (9.42)	1,216.5 (47.9)
Source: Meteomanz(precipitation)

== Landmarks ==
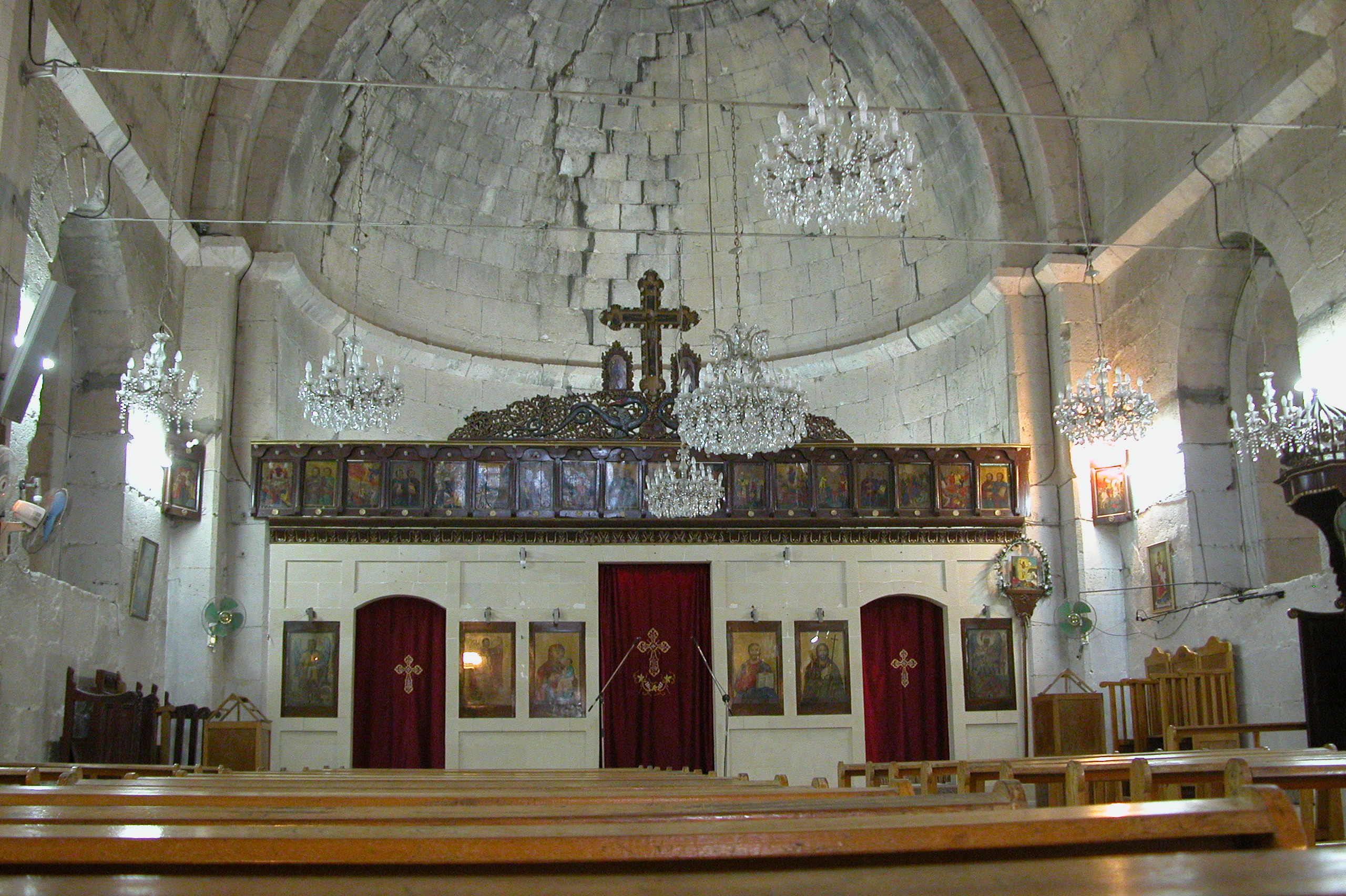
St. Michael's Chapel on the ground floor of Chastel Blanc.

The Crusader fortress "Chastel Blanc", a square tower built in 1202, is well preserved and rises to a height of 28 meters. It is 18 meters wide and 31 meters long. Among its walls, 3 meters high, is a chapel dedicated to St. Michael and serving the Greek Orthodox community of the city. The second floor of the building, which can be ascended in a stone staircase, was originally used as a dormitory and is illuminated by firing slits. Beneath the tower was a water cistern that was used by the inhabitants of the fortress.

== Bibliography ==
- Abu-Husayn, Abdul-Rahim (1985). Provincial Leaderships in Syria, 1575-1650. Beirut: American University of Beirut.
- Balanche, Fabrice (2000). "Les Alaouites, l'espace et le pouvoir dans la région côtière syrienne : une intégration nationale ambiguë" (in French). Tours: Université François Rabelais.
- Betts, Robert Brenton (1978). Christians in the Arab East: A Political Study. John Knox Press. ISBN 9780804207966.
- Winter, Stefan (2016). A History of the 'Alawis: From Medieval Aleppo to the Turkish Republic. Princeton and Oxford: Princeton University Press. ISBN 9780691173894.
