= Safita District =

Safita District منطقة صافيتا
- District
- Map of Safita District within Tartus Governorate
- Coordinates (Safita): 34°49′N 36°07′E
- Country: Syria
- Governorate: Tartus
- Seat: Safita
- Subdistricts: 6 nawāḥī

Area
  - Total: 355.75 km^{2} (137.36 sq mi)

Population (2004)
  - Total: 129,632
  - Density: 364.39/km^{2} (943.77/sq mi)
- Geocode: SY1003

Safita District (Arabic: منطقة صافيتا, romanized: manṭiqat Ṣāfītā) is a district of the Tartus Governorate in northwestern Syria. Administrative centre is the city of Safita. At the 2004 census, the district had a population of 129,632.

== Sub-districts ==
The district of Safita is divided into six sub-districts or nawāḥī (population as of 2004):

- Safita Subdistrict (ناحية صافيتا): population 60,172.
- Mashta al-Helu Subdistrict (ناحية مشتى الحلو): population 12,577.
- Al-Bariqiyah Subdistrict (ناحية البارقية): population 7,336.
- Sebei Subdistrict (ناحية سبة): population 7,614.
- Al-Sisiniyah Subdistrict (ناحية السيسنية): population 22,018.
- Ras al-Khashufah Subdistrict (ناحية رأس الخشوفة): population 19,915.
