= Tartus District =

Tartus District منطقة طرطوس
- District
- Map of Tartus District within Tartus Governorate
- Coordinates (Tartus): 34°53′N 35°53′E
- Country: Syria
- Governorate: Tartus
- Seat: Tartus
- Subdistricts: 7 nawāḥī

Area
  - Total: 536.71 km^{2} (207.22 sq mi)

Population (2004)
  - Total: 283,571
  - Density: 528.35/km^{2} (1,368.4/sq mi)
- Geocode: SY1000

Tartus District (Arabic: منطقة طرطوس, romanized: manṭiqat Ṭarṭūs) is a district of the Tartus Governorate in northwestern Syria. The administrative centre is the city of Tartus. At the 2004 census, the district had a population of 283,571.

== Sub-districts ==
The district of Tartus is divided into seven sub-districts or nawāḥī (population as of 2004):

- Tartus Subdistrict (ناحية طرطوس): population 162,980.
- Arwad Subdistrict (ناحية أرواد): population 4,403.
- Al-Hamidiyah Subdistrict (ناحية الحميدية): population 20,309.
- Khirbet al-Maazah Subdistrict (ناحية خربة المعزة): population 22,897.
- Al-Sawda Subdistrict (ناحية السودا): population 32,295.
- Al-Karimah Subdistrict (ناحية الكريمة): population 17,271.
- Al-Safsafah Subdistrict (ناحية صفصافة): population 23,416.
