= Dabbash =

Dabbash دباش Dibbash
- Village
- Location within Syria
- Coordinates: 35°30′50″N 36°4′13″E
- Country: Syria
- Governorate: Latakia
- District: Qardaha
- Subdistrict: Al-Fakhurah

Population (2004)
  - Total: 472
- Time zone: UTC+2 (EET)
  - Summer (DST): UTC+3 (EEST)

Dabbash (Arabic: دباش, also spelled Dibbash) is a village in northwestern Syria, administratively part of the Latakia Governorate, located 10 kilometers (6.2 mi) north of Qardaha in the al-Fakhurah subdistrict. According to the Syria Central Bureau of Statistics, Dabbash had a population of 472 in the 2004 census. The inhabitants of the village are predominantly Alawites, with a small Christian community.

== Geography ==
Dabbash sits on an elevation 600 meters (2,000 ft) above sea level, its houses scattered across the slopes of Jabal Arba'in. The village lands have been terraced for multiple generations. The village water is supplied by several springs, which support its cherry, walnut and almond orchards. The principal crop of Dabbash is tobacco.

== History ==
The village population declined from 595 in 1960 to 444 in 1994, with the decrease attributed to emigration to Latakia for work in its tobacco factory and Damascus for army service and low birthrates. The Christian community in particular declined from 38% of the population in the 1935 census (101 out of 274 residents) to 7.5% in 1994. The sharpest decline occurred between 1960 and 1970, after which the population stabilized due to the improvement of living conditions, new jobs in the area, and improved public transportation. A carpet factory was opened in the 1970s and the road to Latakia was paved in 1972. Dabbash contains a primary school and high school. The village is the center of a municipality that also includes five smaller hamlets in its vicinity.

== Sources ==
- Balanche, Fabrice (2000). "Les Alaouites, l'espace et le pouvoir dans la région côtière syrienne : une intégration nationale ambiguë" (in French). Tours: Université François Rabelais.
