= Jawbat Burghal =

Town in northwestern Syria

Jawbat Burghal جوبة برغال
- Town
- Location within Syria
- Coordinates: 35°29′19″N 36°10′36″E
- Country: Syria
- Governorate: Latakia
- District: Qardaha
- Subdistrict: Jawbat Burghal

Population (2004 census)
  - Total: 959
- Time zone: UTC+2 (EET)
  - Summer (DST): UTC+3 (EEST)

Jawbat Burghal (Arabic: جوبة برغال) is a town in northwestern Syria, administratively part of the Latakia Governorate, located east of Latakia in an-Nusayriyah Mountains. Nearby localities include Qardaha, al-Fakhurah, Istamo and Shatha. According to the Syria Central Bureau of Statistics, Jawbat Burghal had a population of 959 in the 2004 census. Its inhabitants are all Alawites.

Because of its location in the An-Nusayriyah Mountains, the Jawbat Burghal area is home to Syria's cedar, juniper, and pine trees. Around Jawbat Burghal are many hiking trails on the western part of the range where these trees thrive. Roughly 300 hectares of land around Jawat Burghal have C. Libani interspersed with other conifers and oaks. Conservation of these forests is highly threatened due to the massive unrest caused by the Syrian civil war and climate-change-induced forest fires. However, it must noted that cedar saplings from this region are highly resilient and have helped in reforesting many former cedar stands located in Lebanon. The region falls under the natural distribution of cedar forests in that region from southern Anatolia to the Homs gap and beyond into Lebanon and the Palestine frontier. Forest conservation and protection in Syria has severely been affected due to the Syrian civil war and rising climatic incidents like forest fires and drought.

The town was the birthplace of Salman al-Murshid. The founder of the (Fada'i), who fought against the feudal lords and their tyranny in various parts of the Syrian coast.
