= Death and state funeral of Hafez al-Assad =

2000 event in Damascus, Syria

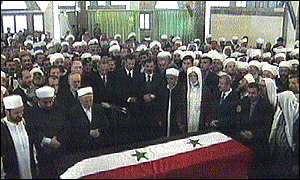
- People praying during the funeral
- Date: 13 June 2000; 26 years ago
- Location: Damascus, Syria
- Participants: Syrian officials and dignitaries from foreign countries

Hafez al-Assad, the president of Syria, died in office on 10 June 2000 at the age of 69. His funeral was held three days later, with his son Bashar succeeding him as president. The People's Assembly convened in an emergency session to amend the constitutional article governing the presidential age requirement, lowering the minimum age from 40 to 34 to enable Bashar al-Assad to stand as a candidate.

== Illness ==
Assad's health began to deteriorate in late 1983 due to diabetes and varicose veins. He was taken to Al-Shami Hospital in Damascus and placed under intensive care. He then transferred his powers during his absence to a committee consisting of five members from his close circle.

== Death and reactions ==
External videos
- Announcement on Syrian television relayed by Israeli television part 1
- Announcement on Syrian television relayed by Israeli television part 2

Assad died from a heart attack on 10 June 2000. He was succeeded by Vice President Abdul Halim Khaddam in a caretaker capacity until presidential elections were held. Several national leaders paid tribute as the leader's body lay in state in the People's Palace.

Following Assad's death, 40 days of mourning was declared in Syria and 7 days in Lebanon. Egypt, Jordan, Oman, Palestine, Libya, Iran, Morocco, United Arab Emirates, Yemen, Kuwait and Qatar announced three days of national mourning.

== Funeral ==
Assad's funeral was held on 13 June in Damascus.

=== Dignitaries ===
States

Country	Dignitaries
Abu Dhabi	Crown Prince Khalifa bin Zayed Al Nahyan
Algeria	President Abdelaziz Bouteflika
Armenia	President Robert Kocharyan
Bahrain	Crown Prince Salman bin Hamad Al Khalifa
Bulgaria	President Petar Stoyanov
Canada	Minister of Foreign Affairs Lloyd Axworthy
China	President Jiang Zemin
Egypt	President Hosni Mubarak; Minister of Foreign Affairs Amr Moussa
France	President Jacques Chirac
Germany	Federal Minister of Foreign Affairs Joschka Fischer
Iran	President Mohammad Khatami
Iraq	Vice President Taha Muhie-eldin Marouf
Japan	Minister of Foreign Affairs Yōhei Kōno
Jordan	King Abdullah II
Lebanon	President Émile Lahoud; Prime Minister Salim al-Huss; Speaker of Parliament Nabih Berri
Kuwait	Emir Jaber Al-Ahmad Al-Jaber Al-Sabah
Morocco	Speaker of Parliament Abdelwahed Radi
Netherlands	Minister of Foreign Affairs Jozias van Aartsen
Palestinian Authority	Chairman Yassir Arafat
Qatar	Prime Minister Abdullah bin Khalifa Al Thani
Russia	Chairman of the State Duma Gennadiy Seleznyov
Saudi Arabia	Crown Prince and Regent Abdullah
Sudan	President Omar Hassan al-Bashir
Switzerland	Head of the Federal Department of Foreign Affairs Joseph Deiss
Turkey	President Ahmet Necdet Sezer
United Kingdom	Foreign Secretary Robin Cook
United States of America	Secretary of State Madeleine Albright
Yemen	President Ali Abdullah Saleh

Organizations

Organization	Dignitaries
European Union	President of the European Commission Romano Prodi
Hezbollah	Secretary-General Hassan Nasrallah

== Burial ==
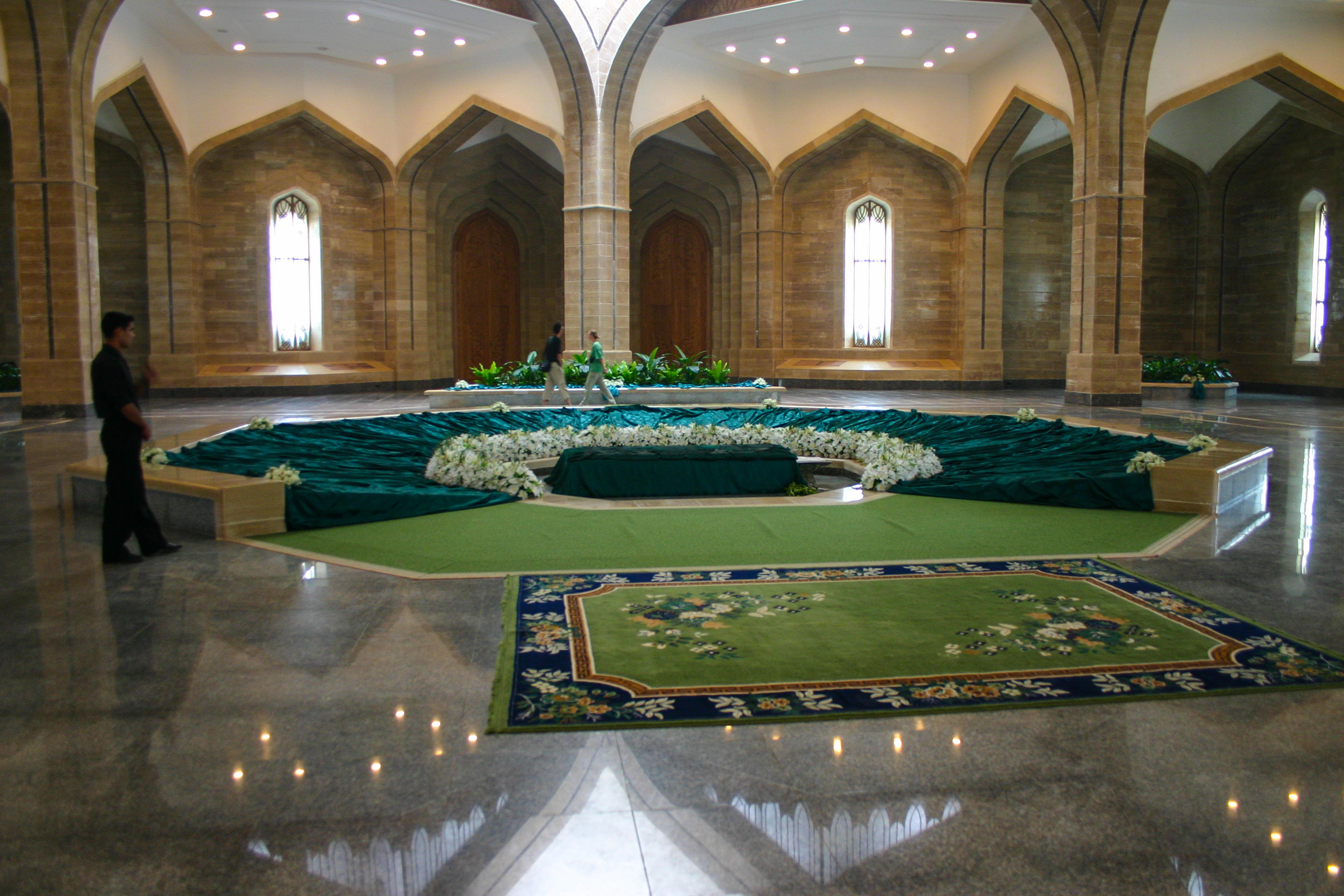
Assad Mausoleum in Qardaha, Syria, before its destruction in 2024

Assad was buried in a mausoleum in his hometown Qardaha in Latakia Governorate, beside his eldest son Bassel al-Assad who died in 1994.

On 11 December 2024, after the overthrow of his son Bashar following 13 years of civil war, rebels set fire and burned Hafez al-Assad's tomb inside the mausoleum. Videos of armed men burning Assad's grave and urinating on it were published online. On 28 April 2025, videos and photos on social media showed his grave being exhumed by unidentified individuals. His remains were reportedly transferred to an unknown location.

== See also ==
- Hafez al-Assad Government
- Presidency of Hafez al-Assad
