= Bishalama =

Bishalama بشلاما
- Village
- Location in Syria
- Coordinates: 35°26′51″N 36°4′44″E
- Country: Syria
- Governorate: Latakia
- District: Qardaha District
- Subdistrict: Qardaha Subdistrict

Population (2004)
  - Total: 1,019
- Time zone: UTC+3 (EET)
  - Summer (DST): UTC+2 (EEST)
- City Qrya Pcode: C3788

Bishalama (Arabic: بشلاما) is a Syrian village in the Qardaha District in Latakia Governorate. According to the Syria Central Bureau of Statistics (CBS), Bishalama had a population of 1,019 in the 2004 census.
