= Syrian Navy =

Maritime warfare branch of Syria's military

- البحرية السورية
- Emblem of the Syrian Navy
- Founded: August 29, 1950; May 9, 2025 (current form)
- Country: Syria
- Type: Navy
- Role: Naval warfare
- Part of: Syrian Armed Forces
- Garrison/HQ: Damascus, Syria
- Engagements: Yom Kippur War; First Battle of Latakia; Second Battle of Latakia; Syrian occupation of Lebanon; Syrian Civil War; Siege of Latakia; Aftermath of the Syrian civil war

Commanders
- Commander-in-Chief: President Ahmed al-Sharaa
- Minister of Defense: Murhaf Abu Qasra
- Commander of the Naval Forces: Brigadier General Mohammed Al-Saud
- Notable commanders: Admiral Fadal Hussein; Vice Admiral Yasser al-Haffi

Insignia
- Service flag

The Syrian Navy (Arabic: الْبَحْرِيَّةُ السُّورِيَّةُ, romanized: al-Baḥrīyah as-Sūrīyah) is the naval branch of the Syrian Armed Forces, responsible for defending the country's coastline and ensure the security of the territorial waters of Syria.

After the fall of the Ba'athist-led regime in 2024, its military assets were taken over by the Syrian caretaker government, and later on, Syrian transitional government.

== History ==
Shortly after the collapse of the Ba'athist regime, on December 9, 2024 the Israeli Air Force launched an attack on various assets of the Syrian fleet. Israel sought to destroy important naval assets to prevent their use by the incoming Syrian caretaker government in the context of the 2024 Israeli invasion of Syria. Among other damage, at least 6 Osa-class missile boats were destroyed in Latakia.

The Syrian Navy, under the newly formed provisional government, first conducted routine patrols on April 25, 2025. The Navy's first large-scale operation was May 9, 2025, in order to combat weapons smuggling and human trafficking. In July 2025, cooperation was reported between the Turkish Directorate General of Maritime Affairs and the Syrian Maritime Navigation Authority (Arabic: هيئة الملاحة البحرية السورية) aimed at rebuilding and operating Syrian ports and developing roll-on/roll-off (Ro-Ro) maritime transport services between Turkey and Syria. Various naval tests were conducted off the coast of Syria during August and September.

== Structure ==
The Syrian Arab Navy consisted of the navy, coastal defense and naval aviation forces.

=== Syrian Marines ===
The Syrian Marines followed the forces of naval infantry, consisting of about 1,500 conscripts, whose primary role was to protect the three military naval bases in the country, which are divided into three units, each of which was to protect one of the bases. These Marines had three amphibious assault ships, each of which can carry 100 soldiers and five tanks.

In general, the Syrian Marine Corps did not receive any special or advanced armament and very little training in the use of amphibious ships, and in general its recruits are only ordinary soldiers and do not have any experience in the ways of fighting as Marines. Although the Soviet Union set up part of Exercise Zapad-81 (the largest military training exercise ever in the entire history of the Soviet Union, and included the largest amphibious landing operation in its history as well), the Syrian soldiers did not participate.

The marines did not participate in any real amphibious naval landing during any of the wars Syria was involved in. Instead, they were used as infantry with a direct ground clash in the Yom Kippur War and in the Lebanon Civil War. During the first Gulf War, as part of the Coalition of the Gulf War, Syria sent marines as a component of its 17,000 soldier contribution, which may mean that it considers them highly experienced soldiers.

After the fall of the Ba'athist-led regime, the status of the Syrian Marines are currently unknown.

=== Syrian Coastal Defense Forces ===
The Syrian Coastal Defense Forces were placed under the command of the Syrian Arab Navy since 1984. The coastal defense consists of brigade infantry, each of which was responsible for monitoring a specific coastal sector, and in addition to them, there was a battalion that monitors. In addition to these forces, there are two artillery battalions armed with 18 artillery pieces, 130 mm caliber M-46. The Syrian coastal defense were also armed with Styx, Sepal, YJ-83 and P-800 Oniks missiles, as well as the K-300P Bastion-P coastal defense missile system.

After the fall of the Ba'athist-led regime, the status of the Syrian Coastal Defense Forces are currently unknown.

== Bases ==
Syrian Arab Navy bases

The Syrian Navy is headquartered in Damascus, with its main base being the Port of Latakia located on the Mediterranean Sea. Alongside this, the Syrian Navy also controls several other bases in Baniyas, Tartus and Minet el-Beida.

Latakia is Syria's largest and most active port, consisting of 23 berths and a section for the repair of military ships within its sectors. Alongside this, it also served as a dock for the Syrian Navy's missile boats.

Al-Bayda Port, located in Baniyas, hosted several training centers for naval officers and special forces, alongside also serving as a dock for transport ships.

Prior, Tartus Port served as the main base of the Syrian Navy, where its two navy frigates, its three amphibious ships and all its minesweepers dock, as well as some missile boats and navy transport ships. With the arrival of the Russian Air Force at Latakia International Airport in 2015, the Syrian Naval Aviation helicopters moved a few miles north to Istamo after a new helicopter base was established at the arms depot. A majority of these assets were destroyed in the Israeli invasion of Syria.

== Equipment ==
After the fall of the Ba'athist-led regime and subsequent Israeli attacks on Syrian territory, resulting in the destruction of its naval assets, the Syrian Navy currently operates a limited number of patrol vessels, alongside other vessels.

=== Vessels ===
Type	Number of ships	Notes
Offshore patrol vessel	At least 6	
Fast attack crafts	N/A	
Modified civilian vessels	N/A	Includes jet skis
Rescue lifeboats	N/A	

=== Aircraft ===
Aircraft	Photo	Origin	Type	Variant	Inventory	Notes
Mil Mi-17		Soviet Union				

=== Small arms ===
Name	Photo	Origin	Cartridge	Type	Notes
AK-47		Soviet Union	7.62×39mm M43/M67	Assault rifle	Standard issue.
Heckler & Koch MP5		West GermanyGermany	10mm Auto	Submachine gun	
PSL		Socialist Republic of Romania	7.62×54mmR	Designated marksman rifle	

== Ranks ==
The rank insignia of commissioned officers.

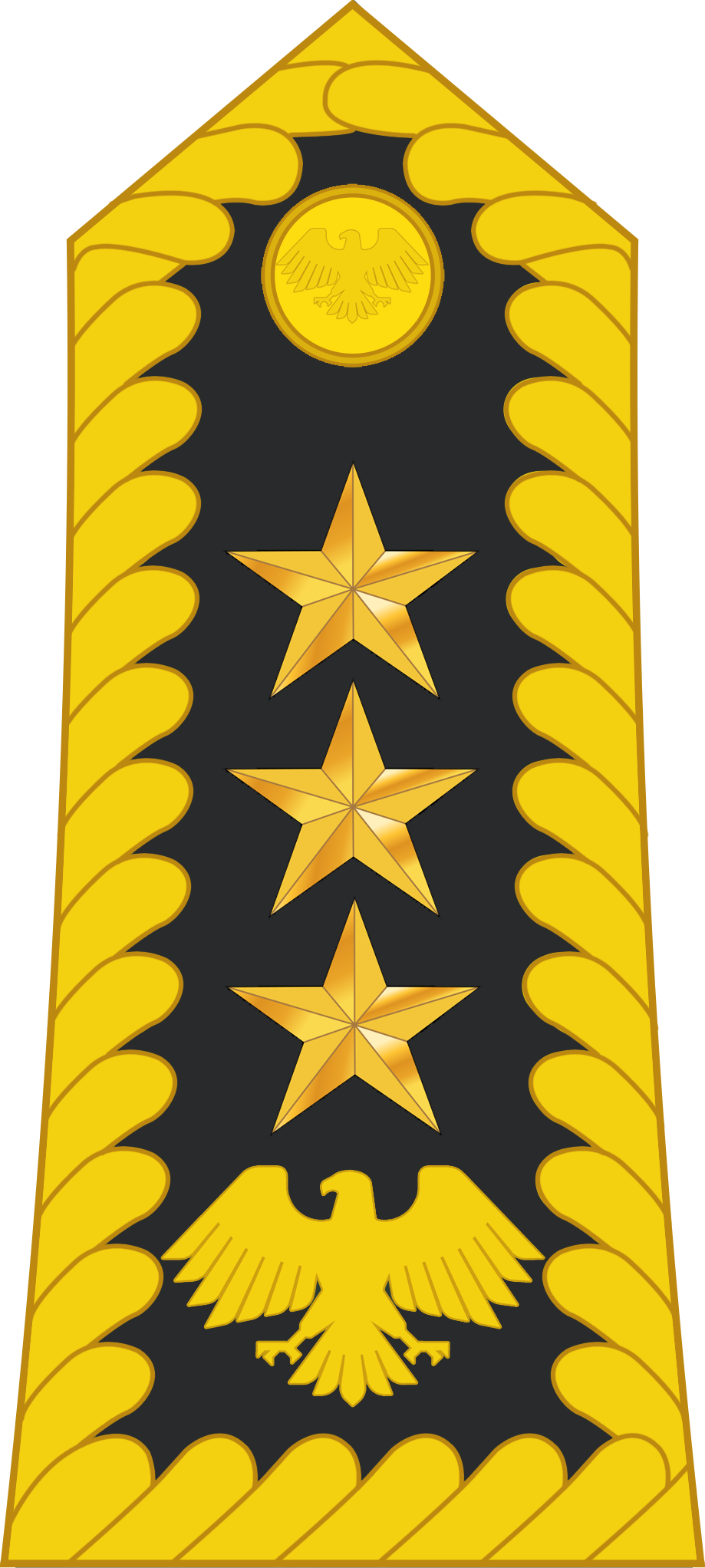
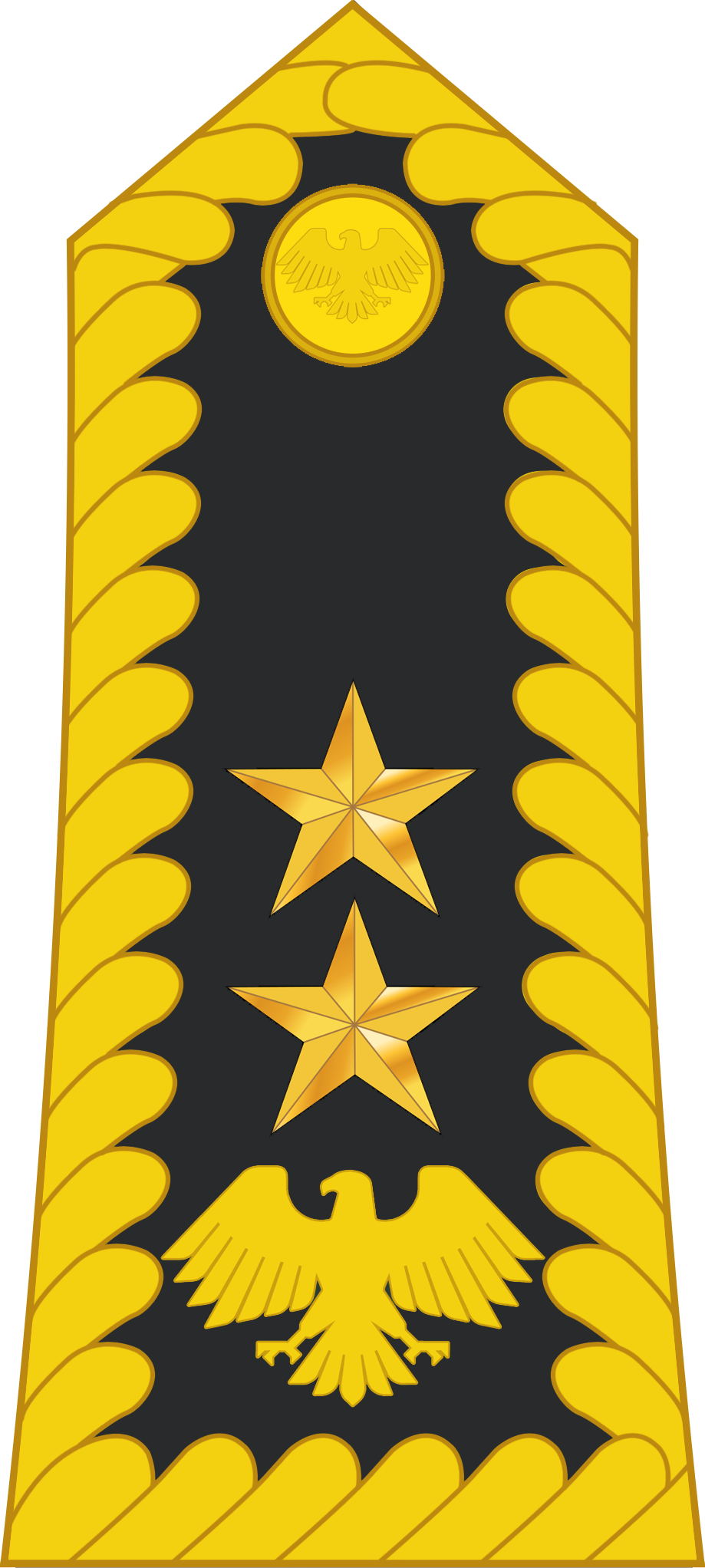
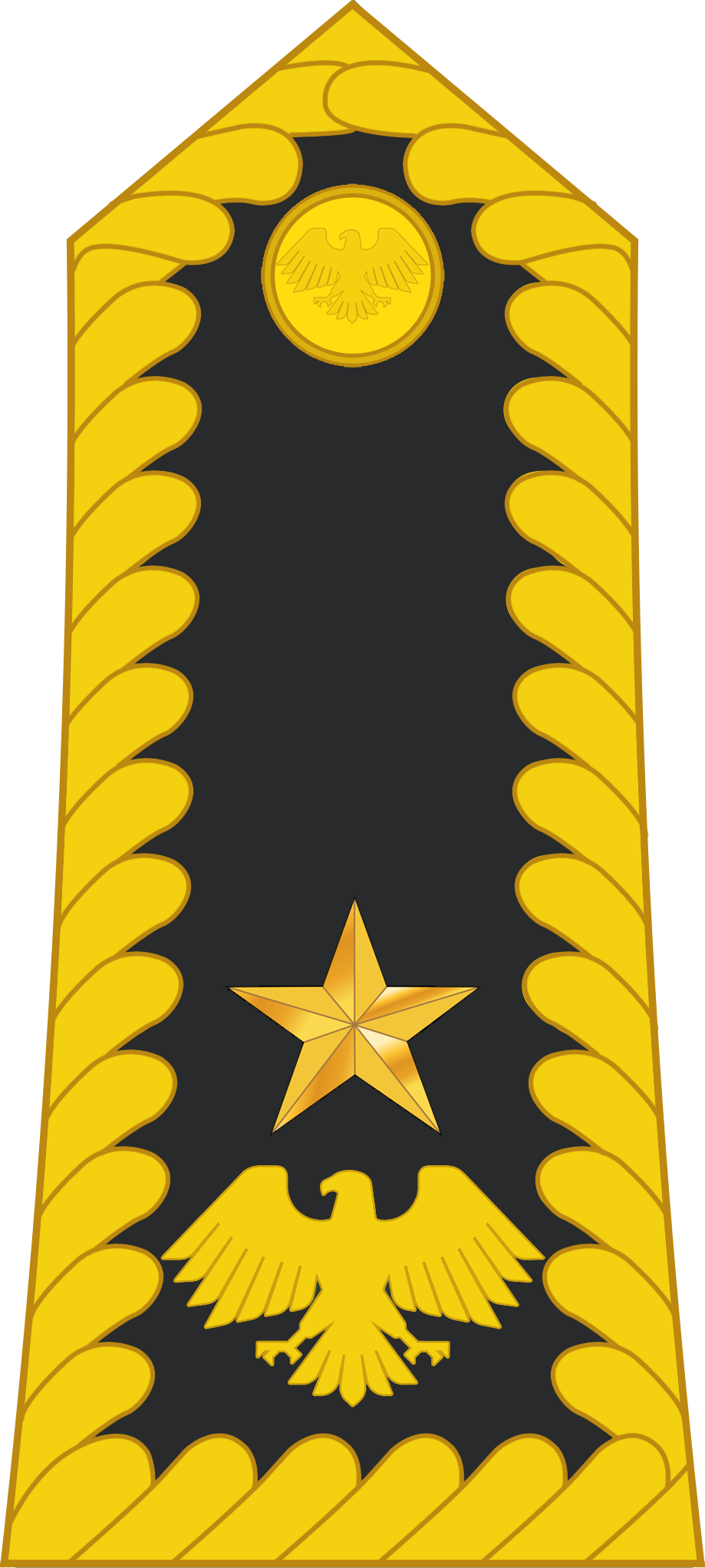
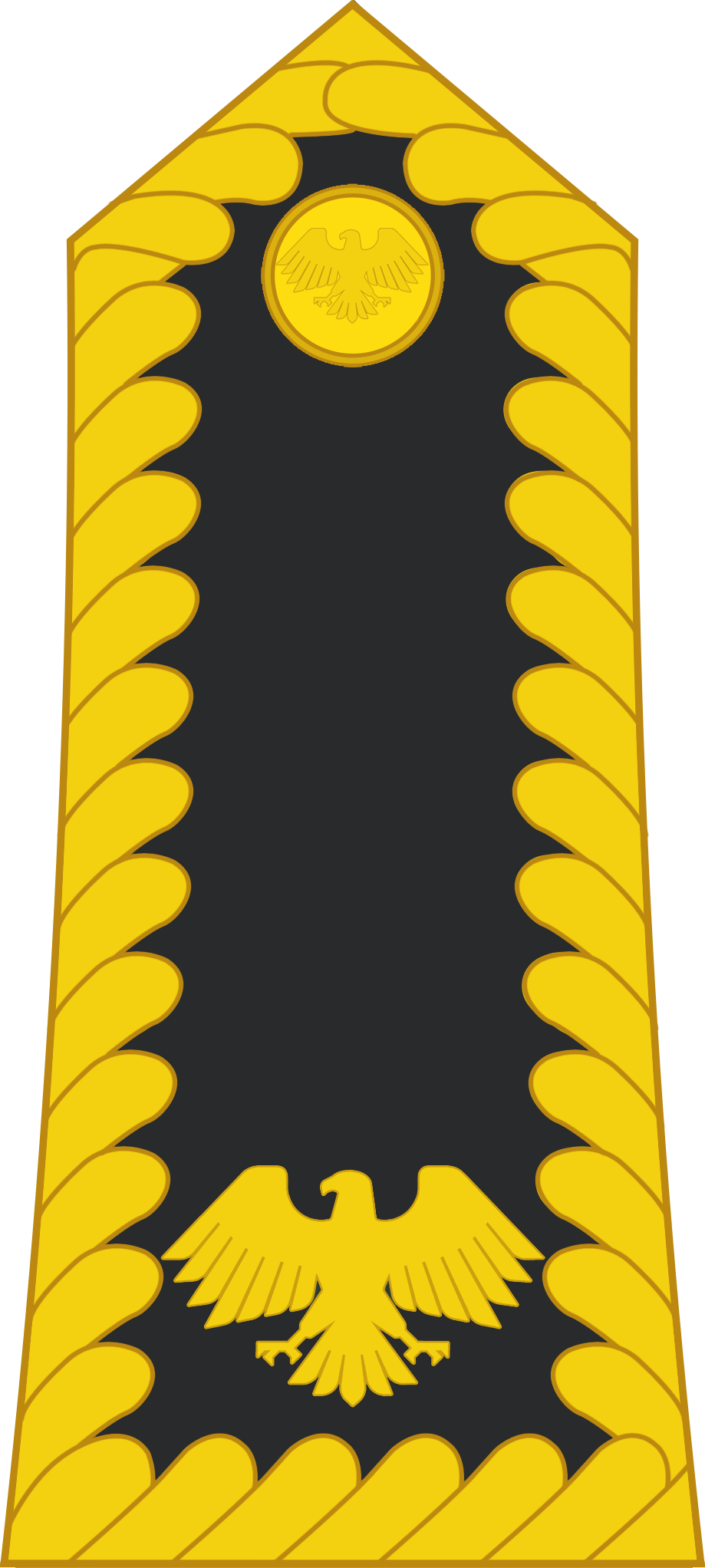
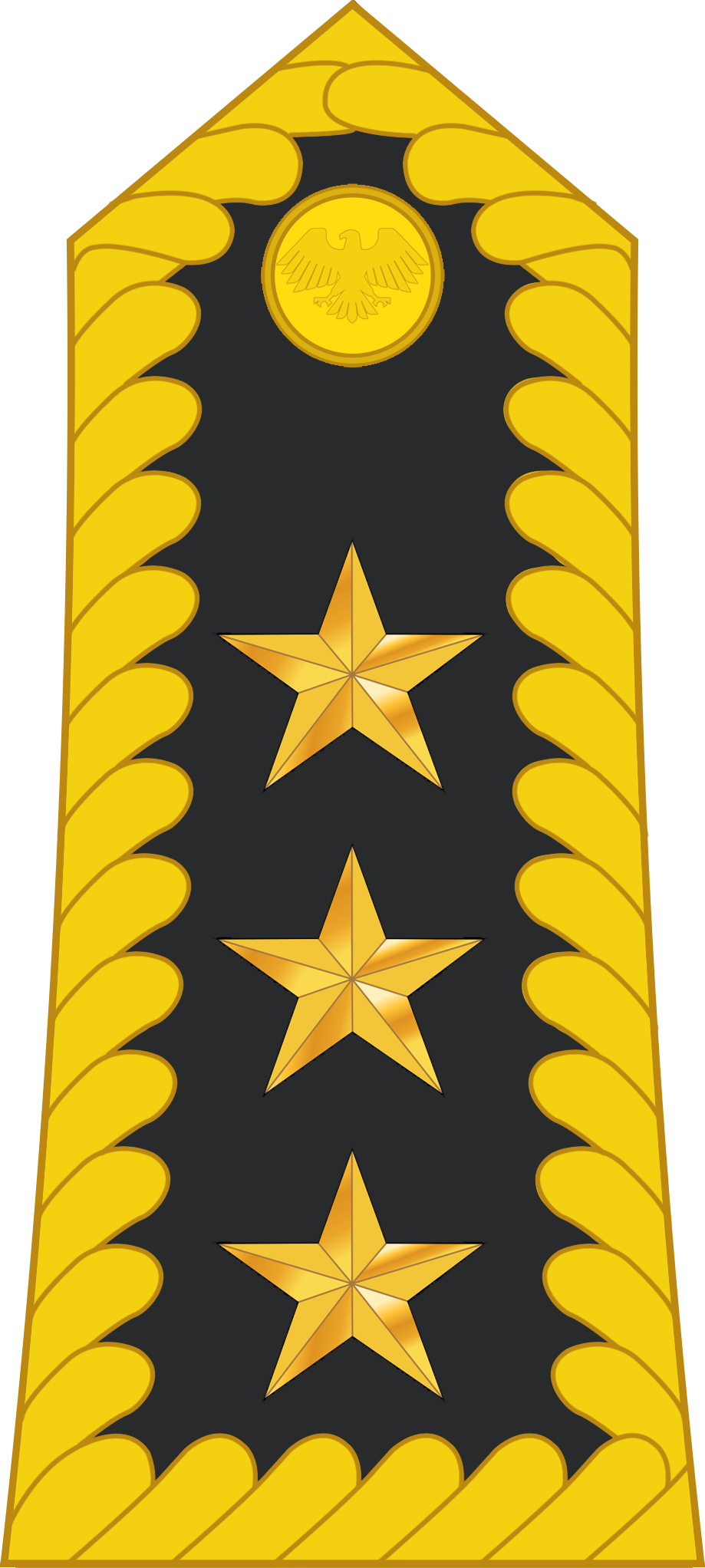
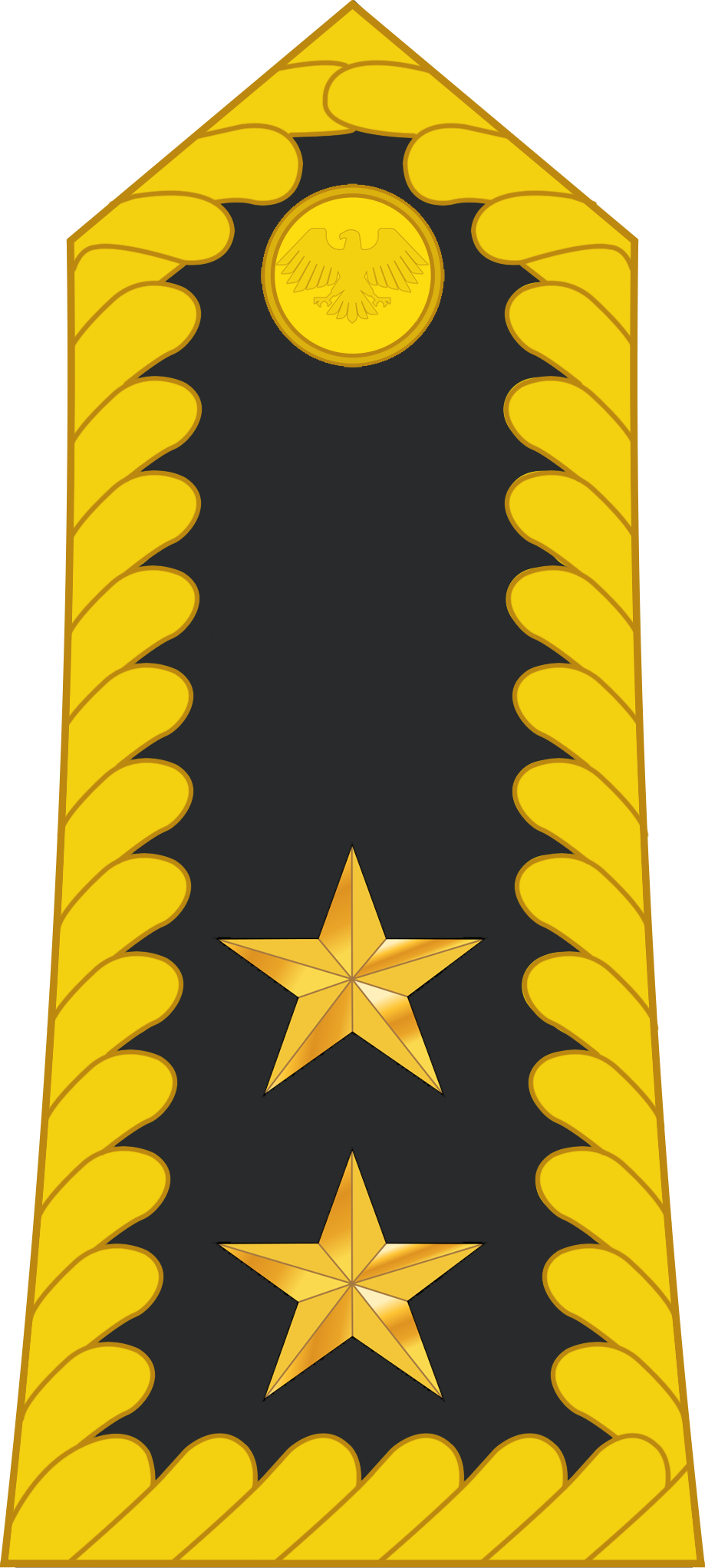
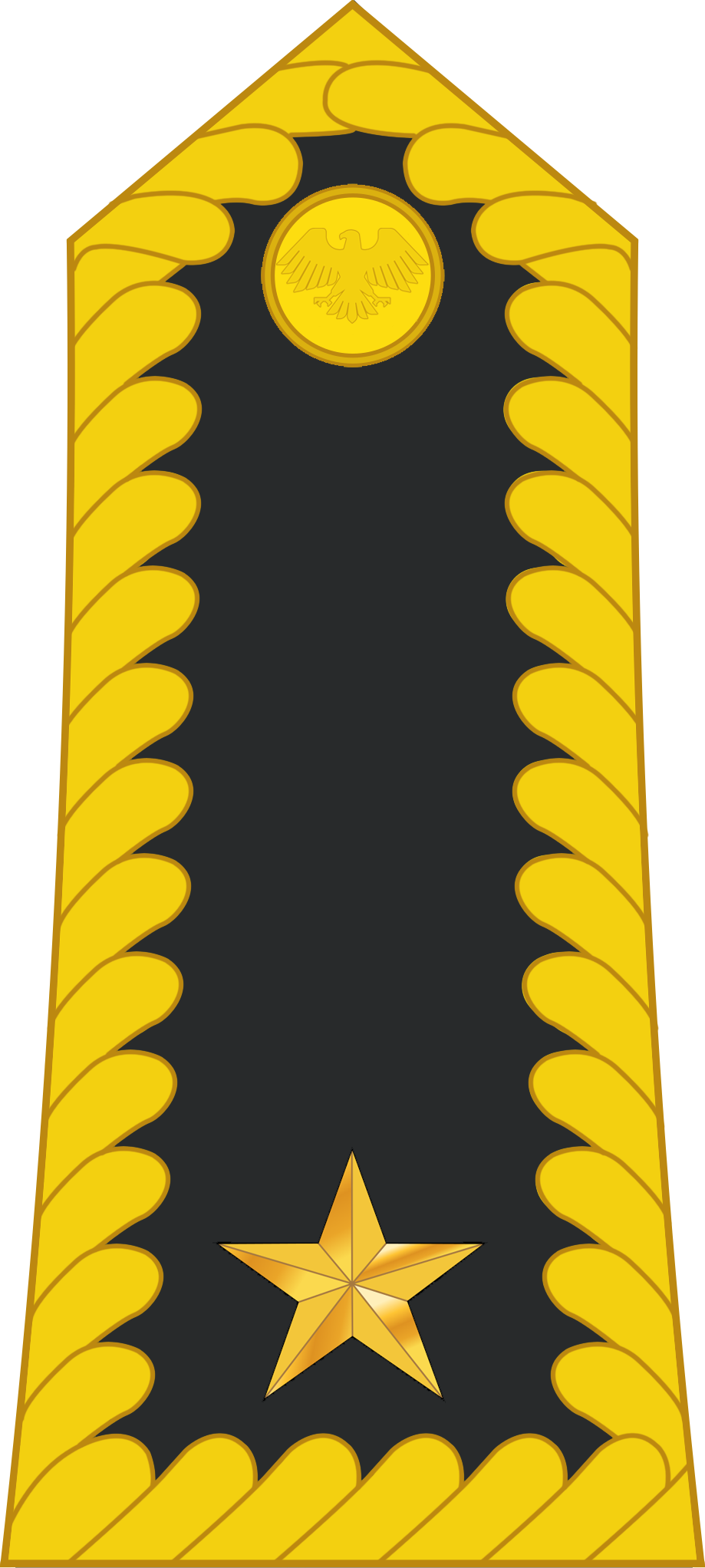
Rank group	General / flag officers					Senior officers			Junior officers
Syrian Navy
Syrian Navy	فريق; Fariq	عماد أول; Eimad 'awal	عماد; Eimad	لواء; Alliwa'	عميد; Amid	عقيد; Aqid	مقدم; Muqaddam	رائد; Ra'id	نقيب; Naqib	ملازم أول; Mulazim awwal	ملازم; Mulazim

The rank insignia of non-commissioned officers and enlisted personnel.

Rank group	Senior NCOs						Junior NCOs	Enlisted
Syrian Navy									No insignia
Syrian Navy	مساعد أول; Musaeid 'awal	مساعد ثاني; Musaeid thani	مساعد; Musaeid	رقيب أول; Raqib 'awal	رقيب ثاني; Raqib thani	رقيب; Raqīb	عريف; Earif	جندي أول; Jundiun 'awal	جندي; Jundiun
