= Assad Mausoleum =

Former Mausoleum in Qardaha, Syria

Mausoleum of the Immortal Leader
- ضريح القائد الخالد
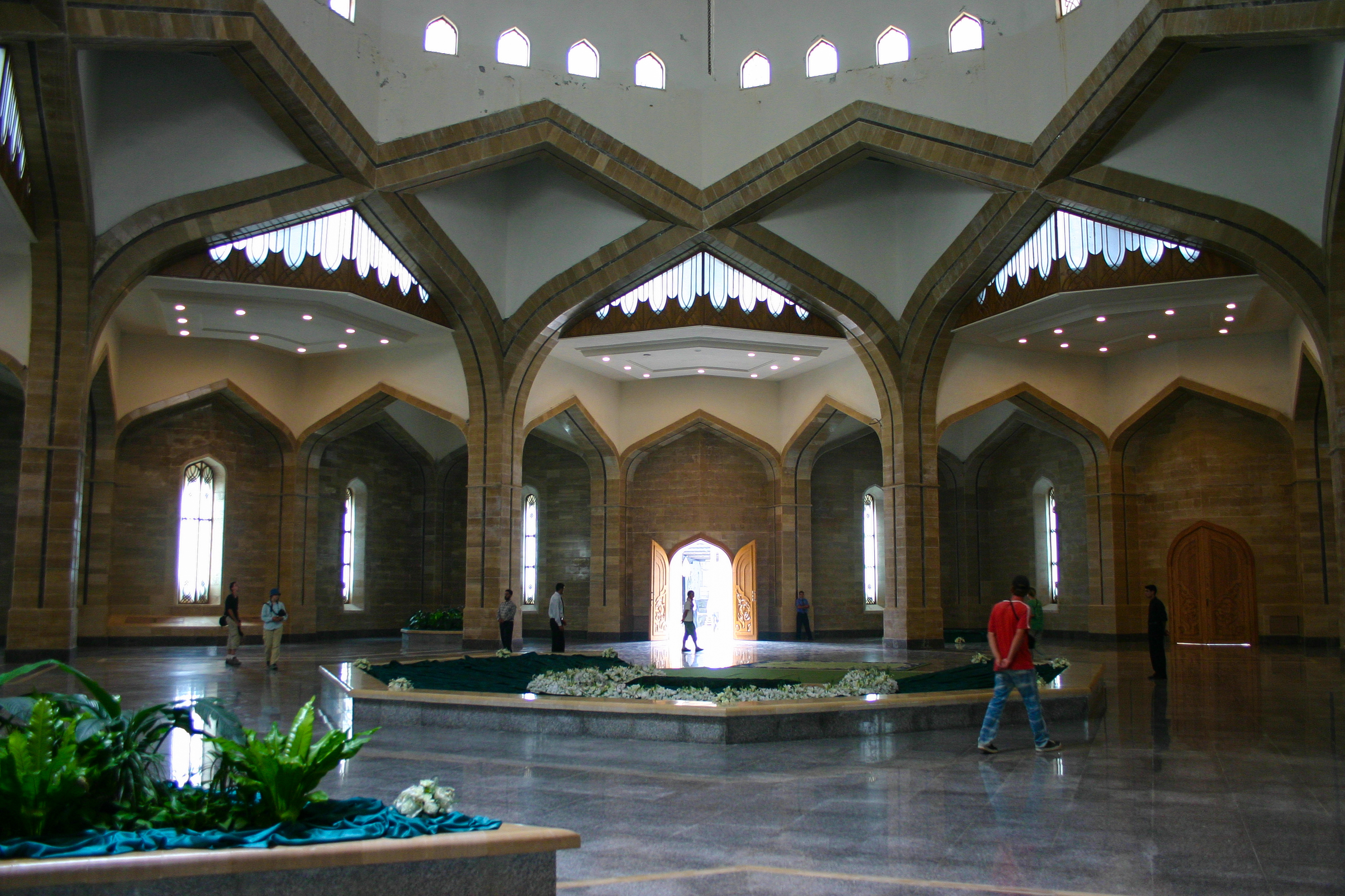
- Mausoleum in 2005
- Interactive map of Mausoleum of the Immortal Leader

Details
- Established: 1994
- Abandoned: 11 December 2024
- Location: Qardaha, Latakia Governorate
- Country: Syria
- Coordinates: 35.459765°N 36.067501°E
- Type: Tomb
- Style: Classical Syrian; Modernist
- Owned by: Assad family Ba'athist regime
- No. of interments: Bassel al-Assad (1994); Hafez al-Assad (2000)

The Assad Mausoleum (Arabic: ضريح الأسد), commonly known as Hafez al-Assad Mausoleum (Arabic: ضريح حافظ الأسد), officially known as "Immortal Leader's Mausoleum" (Arabic: ضريح الزعيم الخالد) during the Ba'athist regime, was the mausoleum of the Assad family, which ruled Syria from 1971 until 2024. It was mainly centered on the mausoleum of President Hafez al-Assad and his eldest son Bassel al-Assad. The mausoleum was located in the village of Qardaha in Latakia Governorate, in the Syrian Coastal Mountains. The predominantly Alawite village was the traditional home of the Assad family. On 11 December 2024, after the fall of the Assad regime, the mausoleum was sacked by rebels.

== History ==
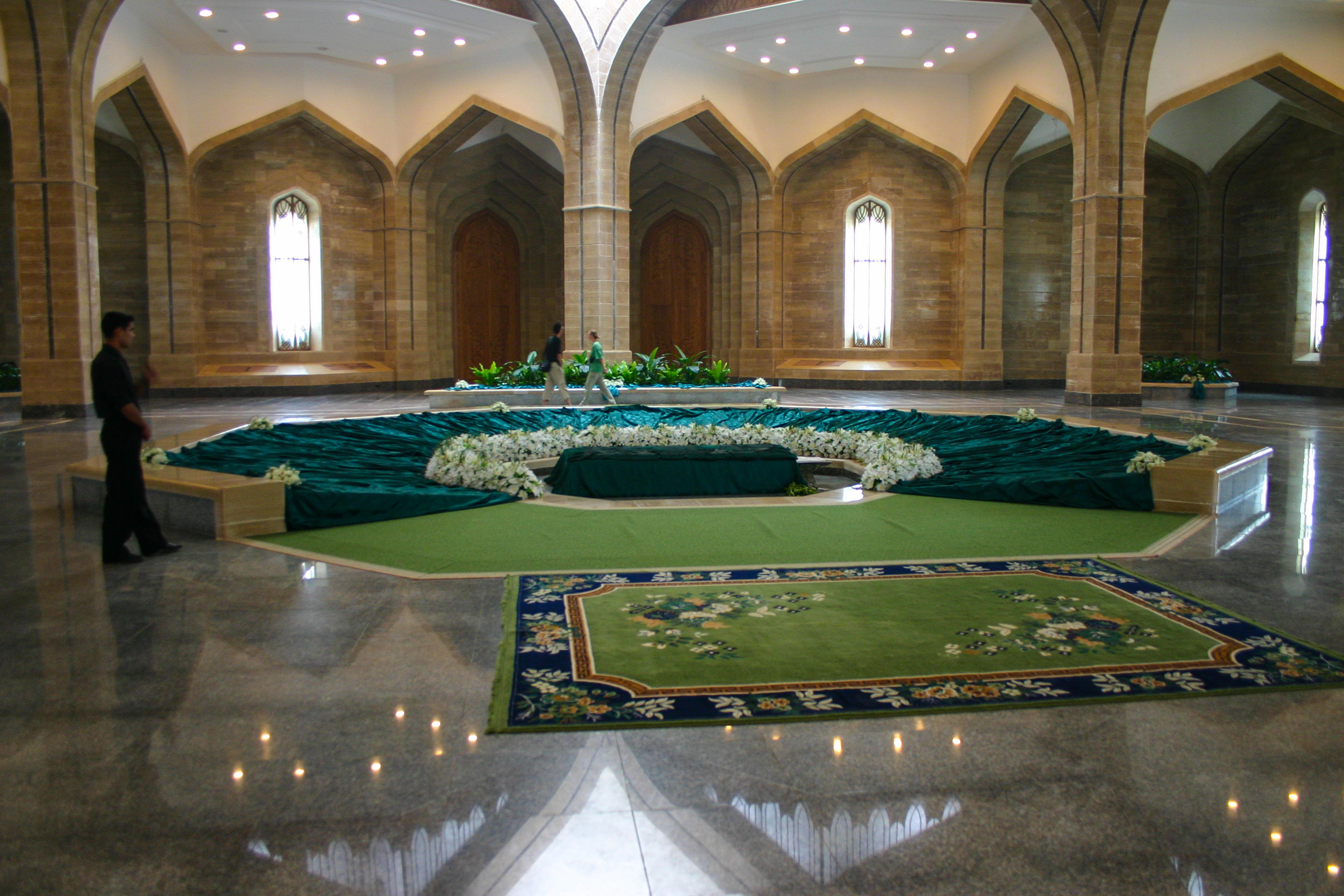
The sarcophagus of Hafez al-Assad, 2005

The mausoleum stood at the land of Sheikh Ali al-Khayyir's house, which was 3 acres in size. Jamil al-Assad and Jaber Shalish forced al-Khayyir to sell the land for less than $200, and initially, they refused it. Since they were powerless, they handed over the land to Assad. Upon acquiring the land, Assad commissioned Military Housing Establishment to build the mausoleum.

In 1989, the Syrian government commissioned architect Abdul Rahman Naassan to design the Naissa Mosque in Qardaha, which was named after Naissa Shalish al-Assad, the mother of then-President Hafez al-Assad. From then on, Qardaha became the hub for the Assad regime's promotion of the "cult of personality".

In 1994, Bassel al-Assad, the president's eldest son and designated successor, died in a car accident. The Syrian government buried him near the mosque and built a mausoleum. On 10 June 2000, Hafez al-Assad died suddenly of a heart attack. After a state funeral in Damascus, his body was airlifted to the Naissa Mosque and buried in the center of the mausoleum. Since then, the mausoleum of Assad and his son had been guarded and maintained by the Syrian security forces and was open to tourists. Bashar al-Assad, the second son of Hafez and the younger brother of Bassel, became the President of Syria after his father's death.

On 11 December 2024, after the overthrow of Bashar following 13 years of civil war, rebels set fire and burned Hafez al-Assad's tomb inside the mausoleum. Videos of armed men burning Assad's grave and urinating on it were published online. On 28 April 2025, videos and photos on social media showed his grave being exhumed by unidentified individuals. His remains were reportedly transferred to an unknown location.

== Architecture ==
The mausoleum was a mixture of classical Syrian and modernist architecture. The overall structure was octagonal in shape. The interior design was clean and restrained. The interior space was large and spacious, with multiple arched high-rise structures. The exterior was decorated with excerpts from the Quran in stone in Arabic calligraphy.

== See also ==
- Mausoleum of Ruhollah Khomeini
- Gamal Abdel Nasser Mosque
- Türkmenbaşy Ruhy Mosque (mausoleum of Saparmurat Niyazov)
- Hazrat Khizr Mosque (mausoleum of Islam Karimov)
- Astana Giribangun (mausoleum of Suharto)
- Anıtkabir (mausoleum of Mustafa Kemal Atatürk)
- Mazar-e-Quaid (mausoleum of Muhammad Ali Jinnah)
- Kumsusan Palace (mausoleum of Kim Il Sung and Kim Jong Il)
