= Death and state funeral of Gamal Abdel Nasser =

- Date: 28 September 1970; 1 October 1970 (Funeral service)
- Location: Cairo, United Arab Republic
- Participants: State officials, foreign delegations, citizens

Gamal Abdel Nasser, the 2nd president of Egypt, died on 28 September 1970, at age 52. Nasser, one of the most respected and revered Arab leaders, died suddenly after bidding farewell to the Emir of Kuwait at the airport, as soon as the work of the emergency Arab summit ended. Vice president Anwar Sadat gave a speech to the nation announcing the death of Nasser. After the news of his death came out, Egyptian television and radio hastily began reciting the verses of the Qur'an. Nasser had never recovered from the second stroke in four years.

Nasser was succeeded by his vice president, Sadat. His funeral was attended by millions of Egyptians and foreign mourners, including leaders. At least 46 people were killed and 80 injured in the stampede. The United Arab Republic and Jordan declared 40 days of mourning, Libya declared 40 days of mourning and 3 days of general mourning, Lebanon, Iraq and Sudan declared seven days of mourning, Brazil, Venezuela, Tunisia, India, Iran three days, and Algeria at least three days. Cuba, East Germany and Yugoslavia also declared one day of mourning each.

Following Nasser’s death, he was succeeded by his Vice-President Anwar Sadat who ascended to the presidency.

== Illness and death ==
Nasser was a heavy smoker and had a family history of heart attacks. He was also suffering from diabetes. He had a heart attack in 1966 and September 1969.

At the time of his death, Abdel Nasser was mediating between the King of Jordan and the leader of the Palestinian Liberation Organization to stop the civil unrest.

== Funeral service ==
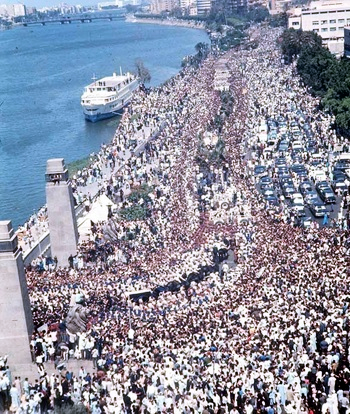
Nasser's funeral procession attended by five million mourners in Cairo, 1 October 1970

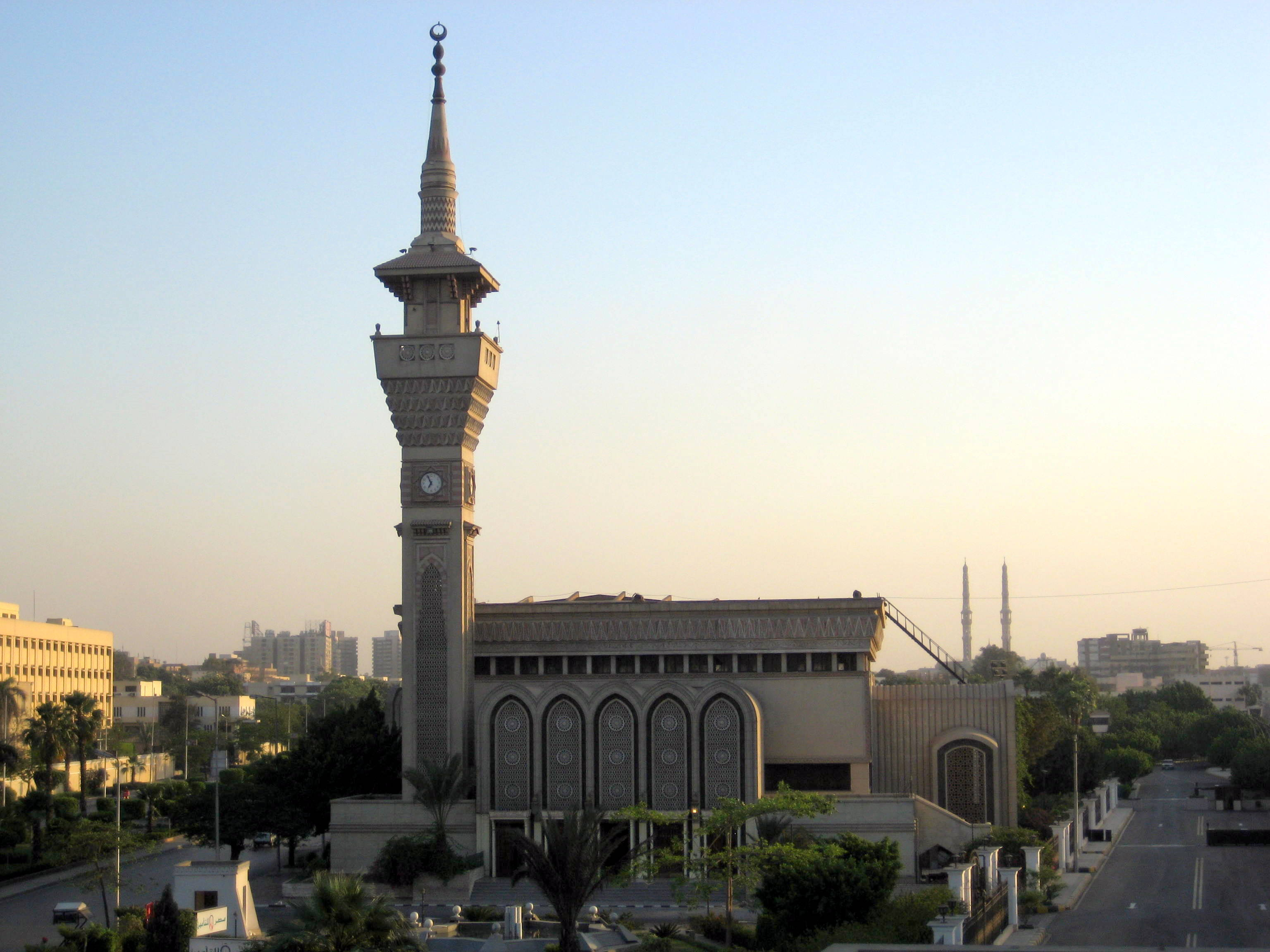
Gamal Abdel Nasser Mosque in Cairo, the site of his burial

The funeral was attended by all Arab leaders, with the exception of the aging Saudi monarch. Even in Arab countries, people came out to express their grief. In Jerusalem, about 75,000 Palestinians marched, chanting "Nasser will never die".

=== Dignitaries ===
States

- Albania: Spiro Koleka (Envoy)
- Algeria: Houari Boumedienne (President)
- Bahrain: Emir Isa bin Salman Al Khalifa
- Canada: Paul Martin (Envoy)
- Central African Republic: Jean-Bédel Bokassa (President)
- Ceylon: Sirimavo Bandaranaike (Prime Minister)
- China: Guo Moruo (Envoy)
- Cyprus: Archbishop Makarios III (President)
- Czechoslovakia: Lubomír Štrougal (Prime Minister)
- East Germany: Paul Verner (Envoy)
- Ethiopia: Emperor Haile Selassie
- France: Jacques Chaban-Delmas (Prime Minister)
- Greece: Stylianos Pattakos (Deputy Premier)
- India: Gopal Swarup Pathak (Vice President)
- Iran: Amir-Abbas Hoveyda (Prime Minister)
- Iraq: Hardan al-Tikriti (Vice President)
- Italy: Aldo Moro (Foreign Minister)
- Japan: Kiichi Aichi (Foreign Minister)
- Jordan: King Hussein
- Kuwait: Emir Sabah Al-Salim Al-Sabah
- Lebanon: Suleiman Frangieh (President)
- Libya: Colonel Muammar Gaddafi
- Malaysia: Mohamed Ghazali Jawi (Minister of Agriculture)
- Morocco: Ahmed Balafrej (Envoy)
- North Korea: Kang Ryang Uk (Envoy)
- Yemen Arab Republic: Abdul Rahman al-Eryani (President)
- Pakistan: Abdul Motaleb Malik (Minister of Health)
- Romania: Ion Gheorghe Maurer (Prime Minister)
- Saudi Arabia: Prince Fahd bin Abdulaziz Al Saud
- Somalia: Mohamed Siad Barre (President)
- South Yemen: Salim Rubai Ali (President)
- Soviet Union: Alexei Kosygin (Premier)
- Spain: Gregorio López-Bravo (Foreign Minister)
- Sudan: Gaafar Nimeiry (President)
- Syria: Nureddin al-Atassi (President)
- Tanzania: Julius Nyerere (President)
- Tunisia: Habib Bourguiba Jr. (Minister of Justice)
- Turkey: Süleyman Demirel (Prime Minister)
- United Kingdom: Alec Douglas-Home (Foreign Secretary)
- United States: Elliot L. Richardson (Secretary of Health)
- Yugoslavia: Edvard Kardelj (Envoy)

Organizations

- GRUNK: Penn Nouth (Envoy)
- Palestine Liberation Organization: Yasser Arafat (Chairman)
- SWAPO: Sam Nujoma (President)

== Suspicions ==
Doubts arose about the cause of death, including that he was poisoned, but these allegations were not supported by evidence.
