= Aws Othman =

Syrian administrator and politician (born 1970)

- أوس عثمان

Member of the People's Assembly
- Incumbent
- Assumed office 5 October 2025
- Constituency: Qardaha

Personal details
- Born: Aws Fayez Othman; 1970 (age 55–56) Qardaha, Syria
- Party: Independent
- Other political affiliations: Arab Socialist Ba'ath (until 2024)

Aws Fayez Othman (Arabic: أوس فايز عثمان; born 1970) is a Syrian administrator and politician who has served as a member of the People's Assembly for the constituency of Qardaha since October 2025. Before entering parliament, he was a local official and member of the Arab Socialist Ba'ath Party, serving as president of the Latakia Provincial Council during the presidency of Bashar al-Assad.

== Biography ==
Othman was born in the city of Qardaha, Latakia in 1970 into an Alawite family. He entered public life through the structures of the ruling Arab Socialist Ba'ath Party and became active in local administration in Latakia Governorate. During the Assad era, he served as president of the Latakia Provincial Council, one of the senior local government positions in the governorate.

Following the outbreak of the Syrian civil war in 2011, Othman remained associated with the institutions of the Syrian government and the Ba'ath Party in Latakia, one of the principal strongholds of the Assad administration.

After the fall of the Assad government on 8 December 2024, Othman was detained by General Intelligence Directorate forces in Qardaha following complaints alleging fraud related to former detainees' cases in exchange for financial payments. He was subsequently released after investigations into the matter. Later, he became involved in local reconciliation efforts as a member of the Qardaha Civil Peace Committee (Lajnat al-Silm al-Ahli).

Following the fall of the Assad regime in December 2024, Awad participated in the 2025 parliamentary election and was elected as a representative for Qardaha in October 2025. His election attracted attention as an example of the incorporation of former local Ba'ath officials into the post-Assad People's Assembly.
