= Al-Aliyat =

Al-'Aliyat العاليات
- Village
- Location in Syria
- Coordinates: 34°32′32″N 36°49′48″E
- Country: Syria
- Governorate: Homs
- District: Homs
- Subdistrict: Al-Riqama

Population (2004)
  - Total: 532
- Time zone: UTC+3 (AST)

Al-'Aliyat (Arabic: العاليات, also spelled Alyat) is a village in the Homs Governorate in central Syria, located southeast of Homs on the western fringes of the Syrian Desert. According to the Central Bureau of Statistics (CBS), al-'Aliyat had a population of 532 in 2004. Its inhabitants are predominantly Alawites.

In April 1924, during French Mandatory rule, followers of Sulayman al-Murshid killed a number of people in al-'Aliyat for not converting to al-Murshid's strain of Alawite Islam. French forces confronted al-Murshid's disciples, who were armed mostly with sticks, and fifty of them were killed, while another fifty were wounded. Al-Murshid was exiled to Raqqa in the aftermath of the clashes.
