= Yarte =

Yarte يرتي
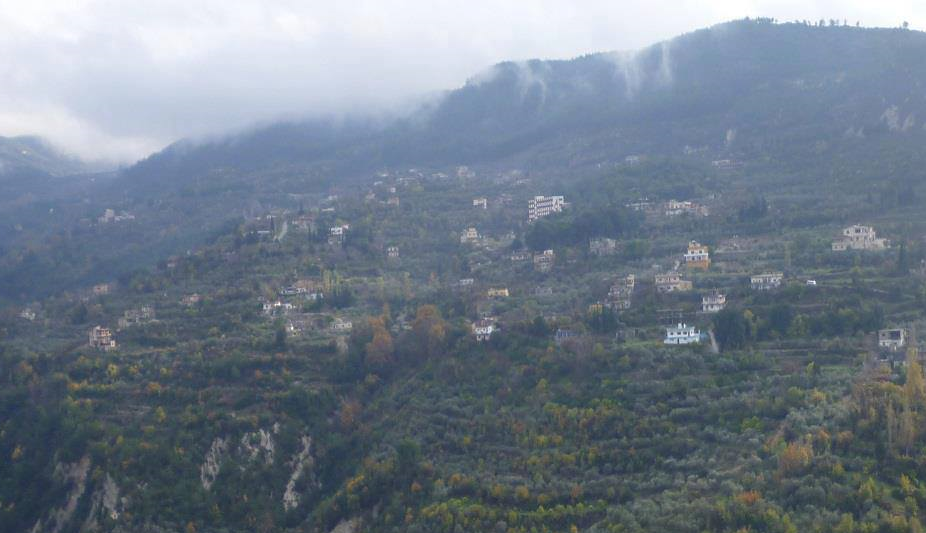

- Location in Syria
- Coordinates: 35°27′N 36°0′E
- Country: Syria
- Governorate: Latakia Governorate
- District: Qardaha District
- Nahiyah: Al-Fakhurah
- Elevation: 400 m (1,300 ft)

Population (2004)
  - Total: 902
- Time zone: UTC+2 (EET)
  - Summer (DST): UTC+3 (EEST)

Yarte (Arabic: يرتي) (also Yarteh) is a Syrian village in the Latakia Governorate. According to the Syrian general census 2004, it had 902 inhabitants.

The village was part of the Ugaritic kingdom and was mentioned as Yʿrt (Yaartu) in the archives of the city c. 1200 BC.
