= Bourguiba mausoleum =

Mausoleum in Tunisia

Bourguiba Mausoleum
- ضريح بورقيبة
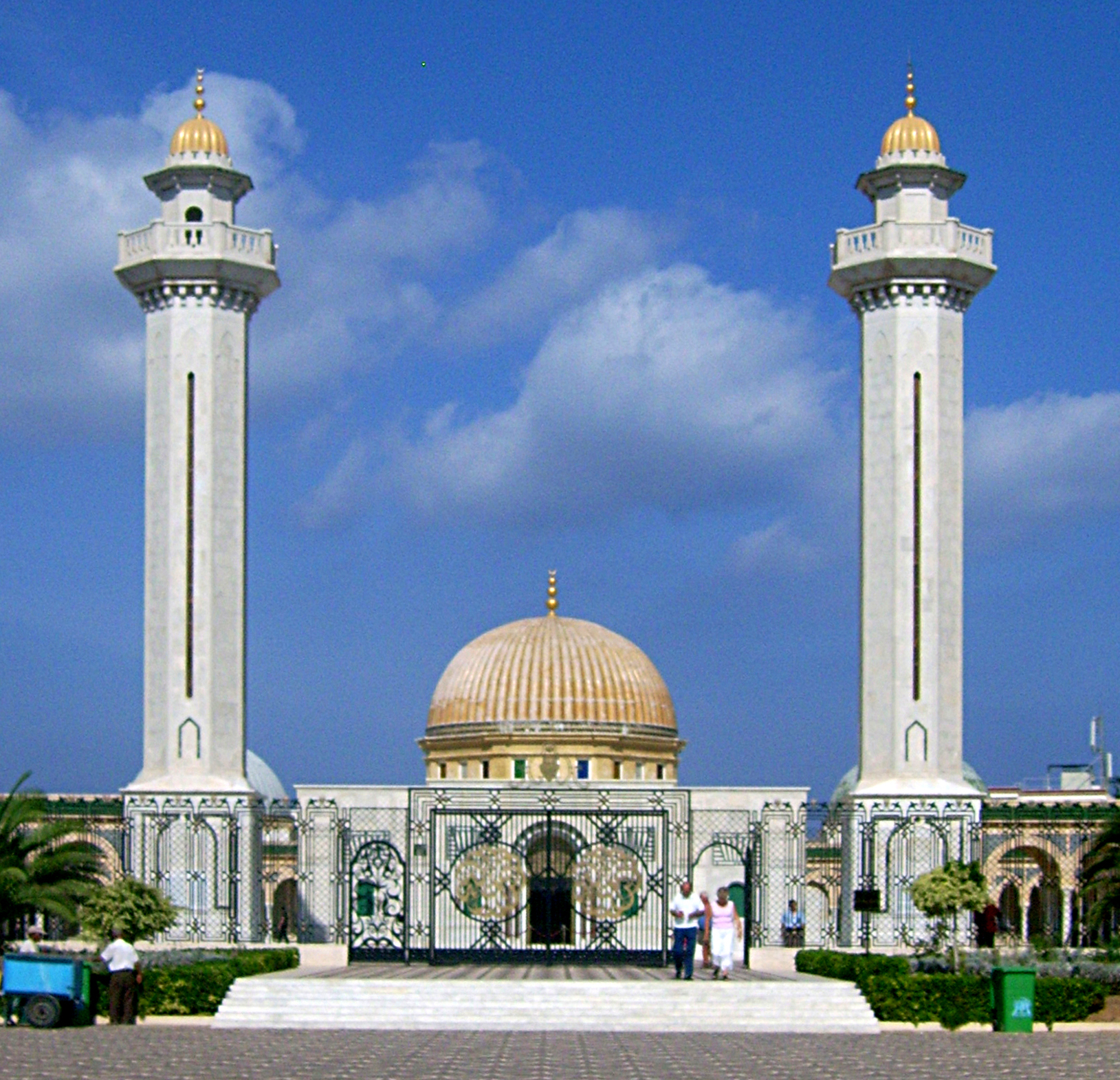
- General view of the Bourguiba mausoleum
- Interactive map of Bourguiba Mausoleum
- Location: Monastir, Tunisia
- Coordinates: 35°46′39.9″N 10°49′42.47″E
- Designer: Olivier-Clément Cacoub
- Type: Mausoleum
- Beginning date: 1963
- Opening date: 1978
- Dedicated to: Habib Bourguiba

The Bourguiba mausoleum (Arabic: ضريح بورقيبة, romanized: Ḍarīḥ Būrqībah) is a monumental grave in Monastir, Tunisia, containing the remains of former president Habib Bourguiba, the father of Tunisian independence, who died on April 6, 2000.

== Description ==
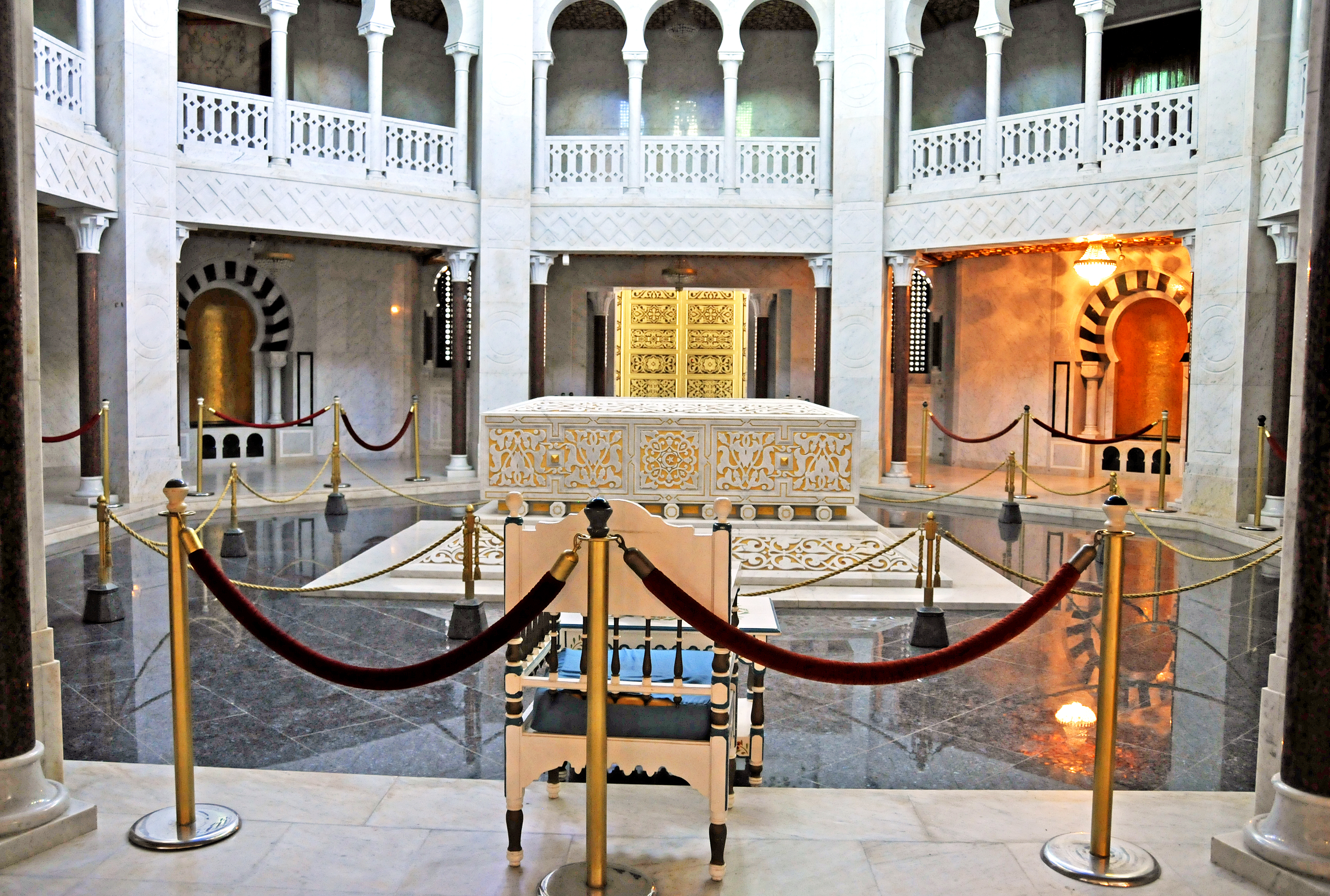
Inside the mausoleum

The mausoleum was built while Bourguiba was still alive, in 1963, in the modern Arab-Muslim style. It is located in the western part of the Sidi El Mézeri cemetery, the main burial site in the city, at the end of the main alley which is about 200 m (660 ft) long and 30 m (98 ft) wide. The building is flanked by two 25-metre-high (82 ft) minarets and topped by a golden dome between two green domes. The mausoleum entrance gate and the gate that separates it from the rest of the cemetery are examples of Tunisian art.

In addition to the former president and his first wife, Mathilde, the mausoleum houses the bodies of his parents, his siblings, and other members of his family in two other halls. It was expanded in 1978.

Inside the mausoleum, there is a small museum housing some of president Bourguiba's personal belongings: his desk from the presidential palace of Carthage, his pens, passports and identity card, his glasses, and also his photos and his clothes (both Western and traditional: jebba, chéchia, and fez).

== Gallery ==
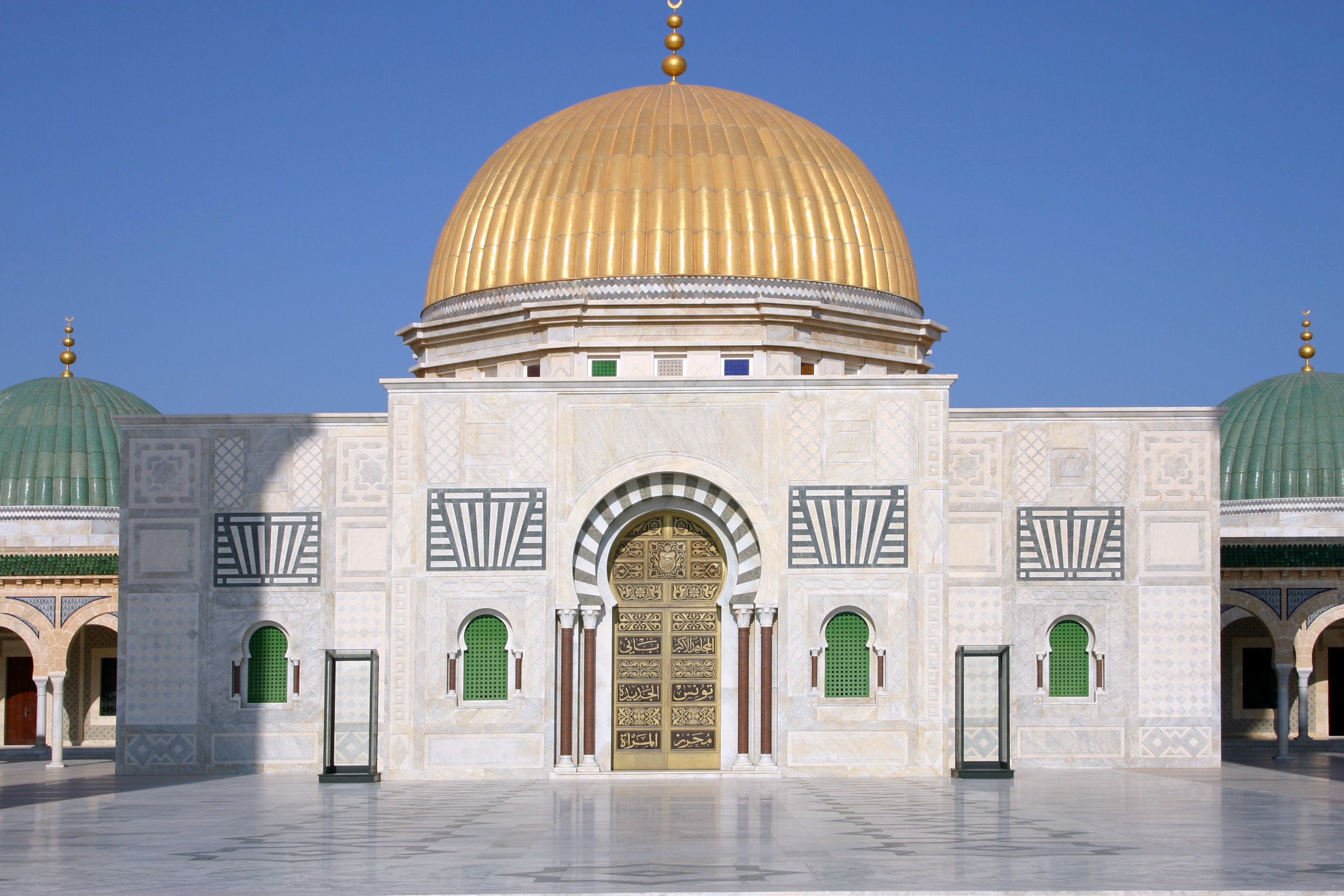
Central part of the mausoleum topped by a large golden dome

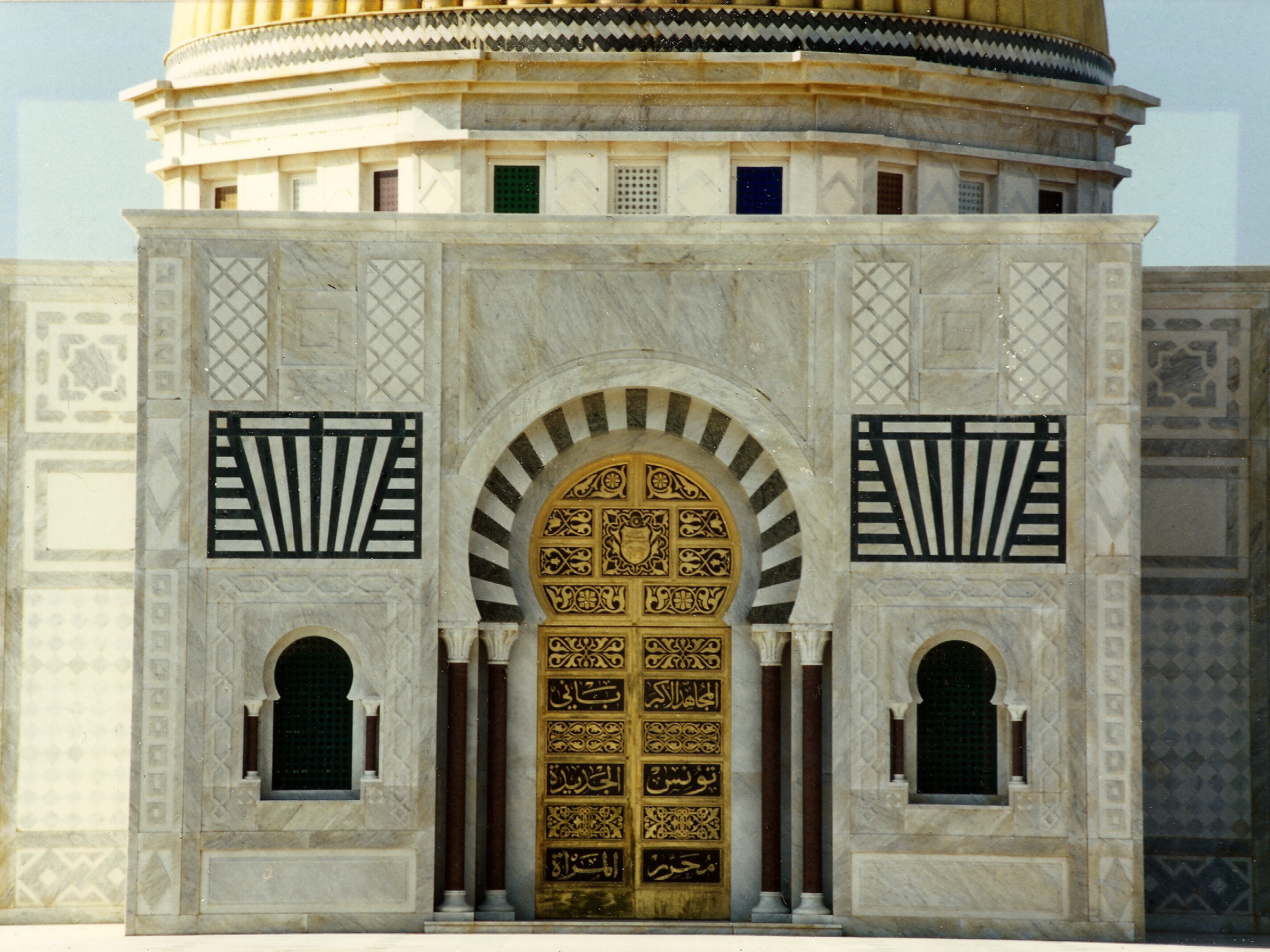
Main door of the mausoleum, made out of teak, with inscriptions in Arabic saying "the supreme fighter, builder of modern Tunisia, liberator of women

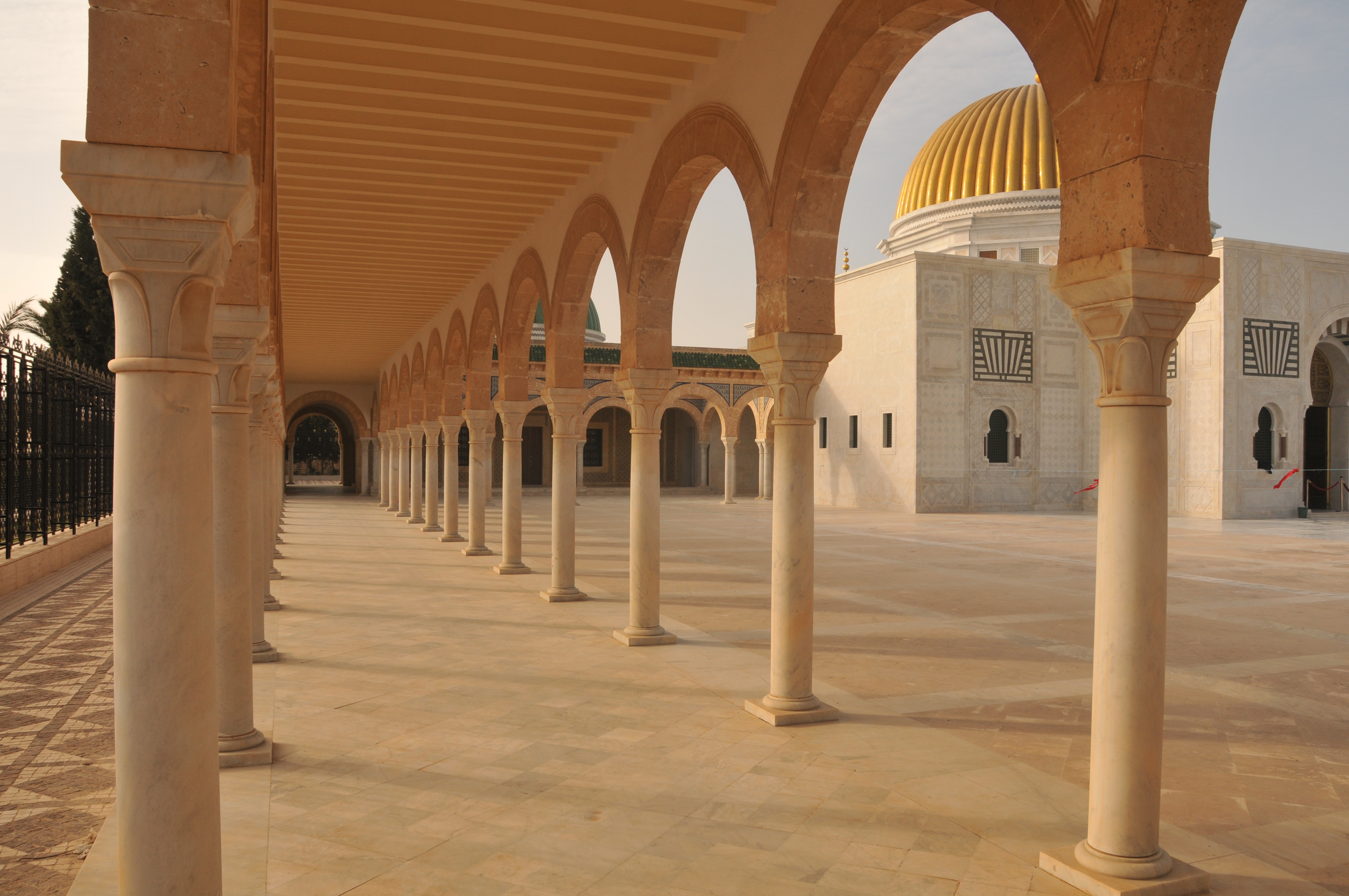
One of the galleries of the mausoleum, the arcs sitting atop white marble columns

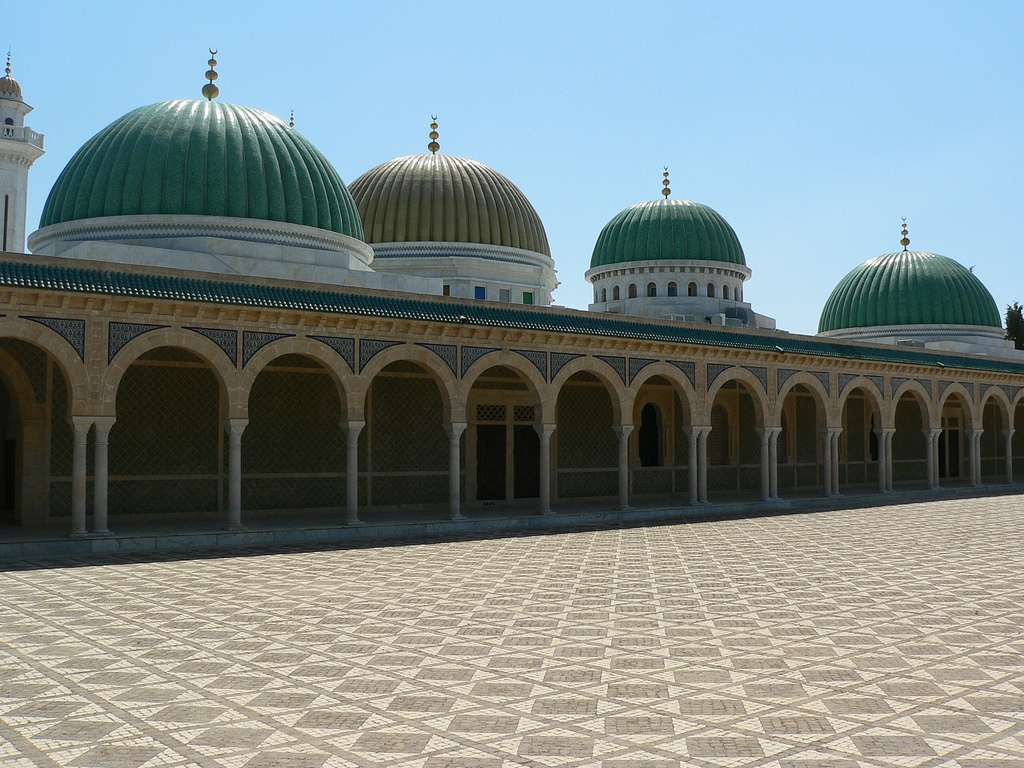
Domes of the mausoleum

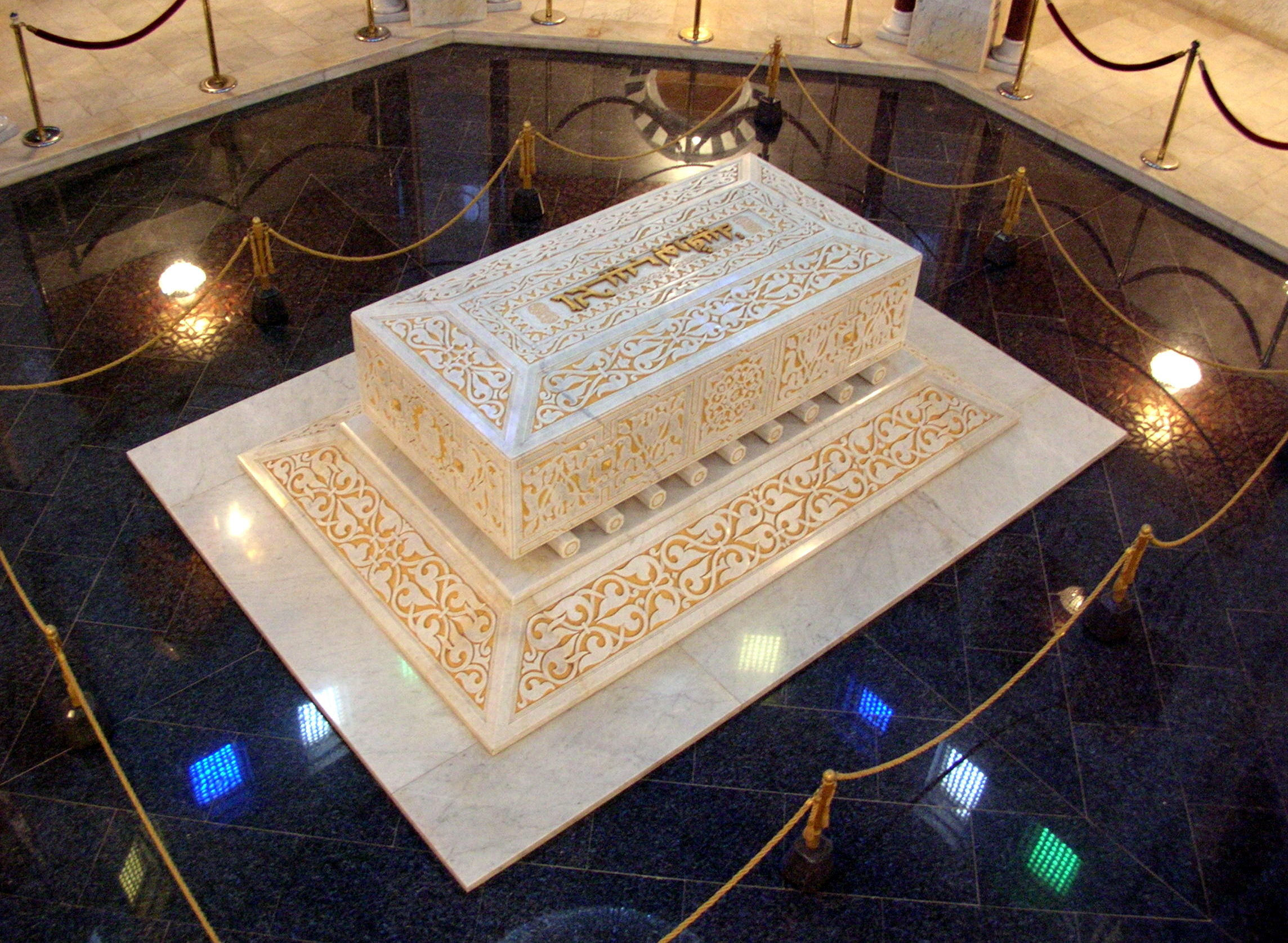
Tomb of Bourguiba

== See also ==
- Anıtkabir
- Gamal Abdel Nasser Mosque
- Mazar-e-Quaid
- Mausoleum of Mohammed V
- Mwalimu Nyerere Museum Centre
- Napoleon's tomb
- Türkmenbaşy Ruhy Mosque
