= Naissa Mosque =

Mosque in Qardaha, Syria

- الْمَسْجِد النَّعِيسَة

Religion
- Affiliation: Islam
- Ecclesiastical or organizational status: Mosque
- Status: Active

Location
- Location: Qardaha, Latakia Governorate
- Country: Syria

Architecture
- Architect: Abdul Rahman Naassan
- Type: Islamic architecture
- Funded by: Naissa Assad
- Completed: 1989

Specifications
- Dome: 1
- Minaret: 1
- Minaret height: 45 m (148 ft)

The Naissa Mosque (Arabic: مَسْجِد نَاعِسَة, romanized: al-Masjid an-Naʿīsah) is a mosque in Qardaha, along the Syrian coast. It was built in 1989 by architect Abdul Rahman Naassan, and funded by the mother of former president Hafez al-Assad, Naissa Assad, after whom the mosque was named. The state funeral of Hafez al-Assad was observed at the mosque.

== Architecture ==
The structure consists of an octagonal prayer hall covered by a dome and pierced by twenty-four colored glass windows. Outside, the courtyard, with a marble mosaic water fountain in the center, is connected to the mosque by porticoes. Also included in the building is a library situated behind the southern portico, and a reception hall behind the eastern portico.

The minaret, situated on the northeastern corner of the complex, stands on a 5-metre-high (16 ft) base and its octagonal shaft is 40 metres (130 ft) high. The architectural style of the mosque is similar to the Dome of the Rock in Jerusalem, with its octagonal shape and dome form, which was built in the late 7th century CE by the Umayyad caliph, Abd al-Malik ibn Marwan. The transparency of the porticoes on the main elevation achieve a central lightness, while at the same time being weighted down at either end by the minaret and the dome of the prayer hall. The minaret and reception hall also balance the opposing volumes of the courtyard and the prayer hall.

== See also ==
- Assad Mausoleum
- Islam in Syria
- List of mosques in Syria
