= What Do I Say? =

"What do I say" (Arabic: ماذا أقول) is a famous poem written by the Syrian poet Hasan Alkhayer (Arabic حسن الخيّر) in 1979. He had criticized both the austere regime and the militant terrorists who together had crippled life in Syria in the late 1970s and early 1980s. He was later kidnapped and killed, in 1980.

The poem was a remarkable contribution by a Syrian intellectual in Syria's recent history that added color to the flame of life in the stagnant political atmosphere. In this poem, Hasan succeeds in expressing complex contemporary issues in very simple language.

Hasan Alkhayer might have been an Alawite.

== Some verses from the poem ==
What do I say? if saying the truth is followed by lashing whips and humid dark prison,

But I can not keep silent as silence is a vice that leads to hiding the light of truth.

And I can not lie as lying is evil, God forbid, I will not lie!

There are two gangs: one is ruling with the name of patriotism and have none of it!

And another gang claims good faith; and religion forbids their sayings and acts!

Two gangs, my people be aware of, both drank from the same evil waters!

Translated from Arabic:

ماذا أقول و قول الحق الحق يعقبه

جلد السياط و سجن مظلم رطب

فإن صمت فإن الصمت ناقصة

إن كان بالصمت نور الحق يحتجب

و إن كذبت فإن الكذب يسحقني

معاذ ربي أن يعزى لي الكذب

عصابتان هما إحداهما حكمت

باسم العروبة لا بعث و لا عرب

و آخرون مسوح الدين قد لبسوا

و الدين حرّم ما قالوا و ما ارتكبوا

عصابتان أيا شعبي فكن حذرا

جميعهم من معين السوء قد شربوا

== Analysis ==
Writing in a region where free expression was heavily restricted, Hasan nonetheless published What do I Say, voicing opposition to authoritarian rule and social stagnation, despite personal risks.

In these bloody years, both fighting factions, the regime, and the fanatics, tried to align Syrians by using the sectarian differences. Poet Hasan presciently pointed to the importance of not losing the national unity that has always been an impregnable Syrian "trademark".

One of his most poignant and emotional verses are about the city of Hama. Sadly, in less than two years after Alkhayer's mysterious disappearance, Hama was to be in the heart of what was later called the Hama massacre.

== Some verses about Hama ==
They said (the regime) Hama is blinded by animosity so it welters; I wonder, can Hama the lair of Baath welter?

If they (the regime) remember what Hama did to the tyrannous, they will cry in fear'

Hama and the people of Hama were the best who held the flags of Baath up and flying

When the people of Hama saw you (the regime) shifted away from moral principles, they honorably shifted their loyalty away from you

Translated from Arabic:

قالوا حماة عماها الحقد فاضطربت

يا للعجيب عرين البعث يضطرب

لو يذكرون حماة الأمس ما فعلت

بالظالمين و بالإقطاع لانتحبوا

كانت و كان بنوها خير من رفعوا

للبعث راياته خفاقة تجب

لما رأوكم نكستم عن مبادئكم

فإنهم شرفا عن حبكم نكبوا

== More verses ==
Because souls fade without hope as hope is the bird that sings in our souls and the rain that gives us a new and pure life, poet Hasan keeps faith in a new land and united people:

The rain will shower my thirsty land, and the darkness and clouds will leave my mountains

There will always be one irreplaceable voice: God the great, we are all Arabs

Translated from Arabic:

سيسقط الغيث في أرضي و قد ظمئت

و ينجلي عن رباها الليل و السحب

يبقى مدى الدهر صوت لا بديل له

الله أكبر إنا كلنا عرب
