= Kilmakho =

Kilmakho كلماخو Arabic: كِلْمَاخُو, romanized: Kilmākhū
- Village
- Location in Syria
- Coordinates: 35°27′40″N 35°59′21″E
- Country: Syria
- Governorate: Latakia
- District: Qardaha
- Subdistrict: Qardaha

Population (2004)
  - Total: 2,252
- Time zone: UTC+3 (EET)
  - Summer (DST): UTC+2 (EEST)
- City Qrya Pcode: C3822

Kilmakho (Arabic: كِلْمَاخُو, romanized: Kilmākhū) is a Syrian village in the Qardaha District in Latakia Governorate. According to the Syria Central Bureau of Statistics (CBS), Kilmakho had a population of 2,252 in the 2004 census.
