= Istamo =

Istamo اسطامو
- Village
- Location in Syria
- Coordinates: 35°28′51″N 35°55′41″E
- Country: Syria
- Governorate: Latakia
- District: Qardaha District
- Subdistrict: Al-Fakhurah

Population (2004)
  - Total: 2,288
- Time zone: UTC+3 (EET)
  - Summer (DST): UTC+2 (EEST)
- City Qrya Pcode: C3844

Istamo (Arabic: اسطامو) is a Syrian village in the Qardaha District in Latakia Governorate. According to the Syria Central Bureau of Statistics (CBS), Istamo had a population of 2,288 in the 2004 census. Its inhabitants are Alawites.

The village was recorded in an Ottoman tax census in 1547 as having 1,272 inhabitants. In 1645–1646, no population was recorded living in the village, but it was noted that ten or so peasants from Istamo had temporarily fled into the mountains. In 1724, Istamo was among several places in the Alawite Mountains where the local strongman Rustum Hasan Rustum was accused of pilfering taxes due to the state.

== Sources ==
- Winter, Stefan (2016). A History of the 'Alawis: From Medieval Aleppo to the Turkish Republic. Princeton and Oxford: Princeton University Press. ISBN 9780691167787.
