= Hasan al-Khayer =

Syrian poet

Hasan al-Khayer (died 1980) (Arabic: حسن الخيّر) was a Syrian poet born in Qardaha, Syria.

He was known for his abomination of sectarianism and for his altruism. He was a candid voice of patriotism. His most famous work is a poem called What Do I Say? in which he sarcastically and invincibly criticized both the government and soulless and sanctimonious militant terrorists who together crippled life in Syria in the late 1970s and early 1980s.

He was kidnapped and killed, in 1980. His body has never been found. This fate made him known by some in the Arab world, as the Federico García Lorca of Arabs. Benevolence and magnanimity are veritable and bona fide traits of Hasan Alkhayer's personality.

He campaigned in support of the literacy of women in the 1960s and fought against obscurantism throughout his life. He believed that repression is one of the basic causes of cultural retrogression and works only to knit the repressed.
