= Hazrat Khizr Mosque =

Mosque in Samarkand, Uzbekistan

Coordinates: 39°39′48″N 66°59′00″E

- Hazrati Xizr masjidi
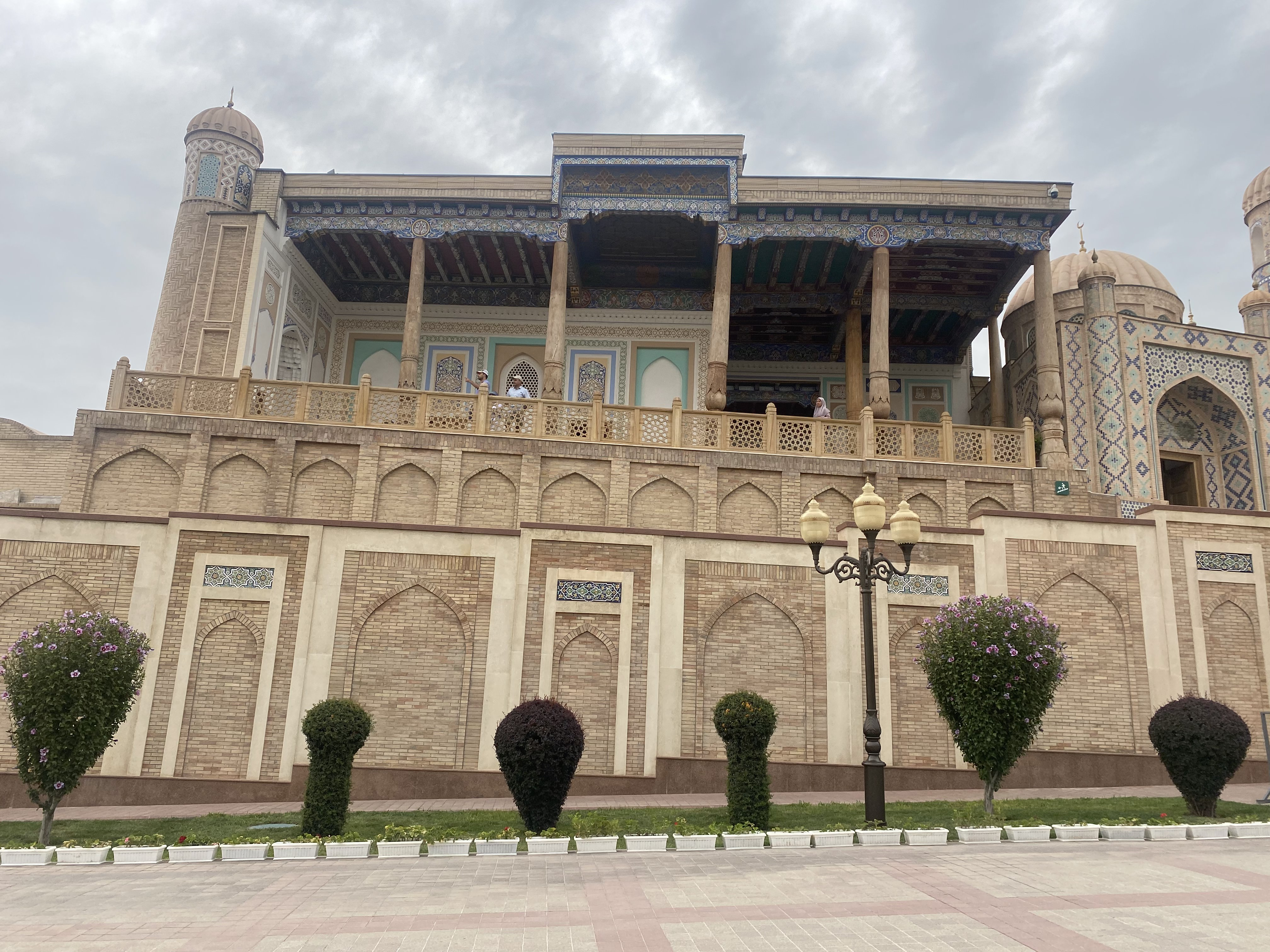

Religion
- Affiliation: Islam
- Branch/tradition: Islam

Location
- Location: Samarkand, Uzbekistan
- Interactive map of Hazrat Khizr Mosque

Architecture
- Architect: Abduqodir bin Boqiy
- Style: Persian

Specifications
- Dome: 1
- Minaret: 1
- Materials: Brick, wood, plaster

The Hazrat Khizr Mosque is a historical monument in Samarkand, Uzbekistan (mid-19th century); associated with the name of the legendary Islamic prophet Khizr. The building was erected on the site of an ancient mosque (according to the inscription on the mihrab, in 1855). The monument is located opposite the Shah-i-Zinda complex on a hill. In 2018, the mausoleum of the First President of the Republic of Uzbekistan Islam Karimov was opened in the territory of the mosque.

== History ==
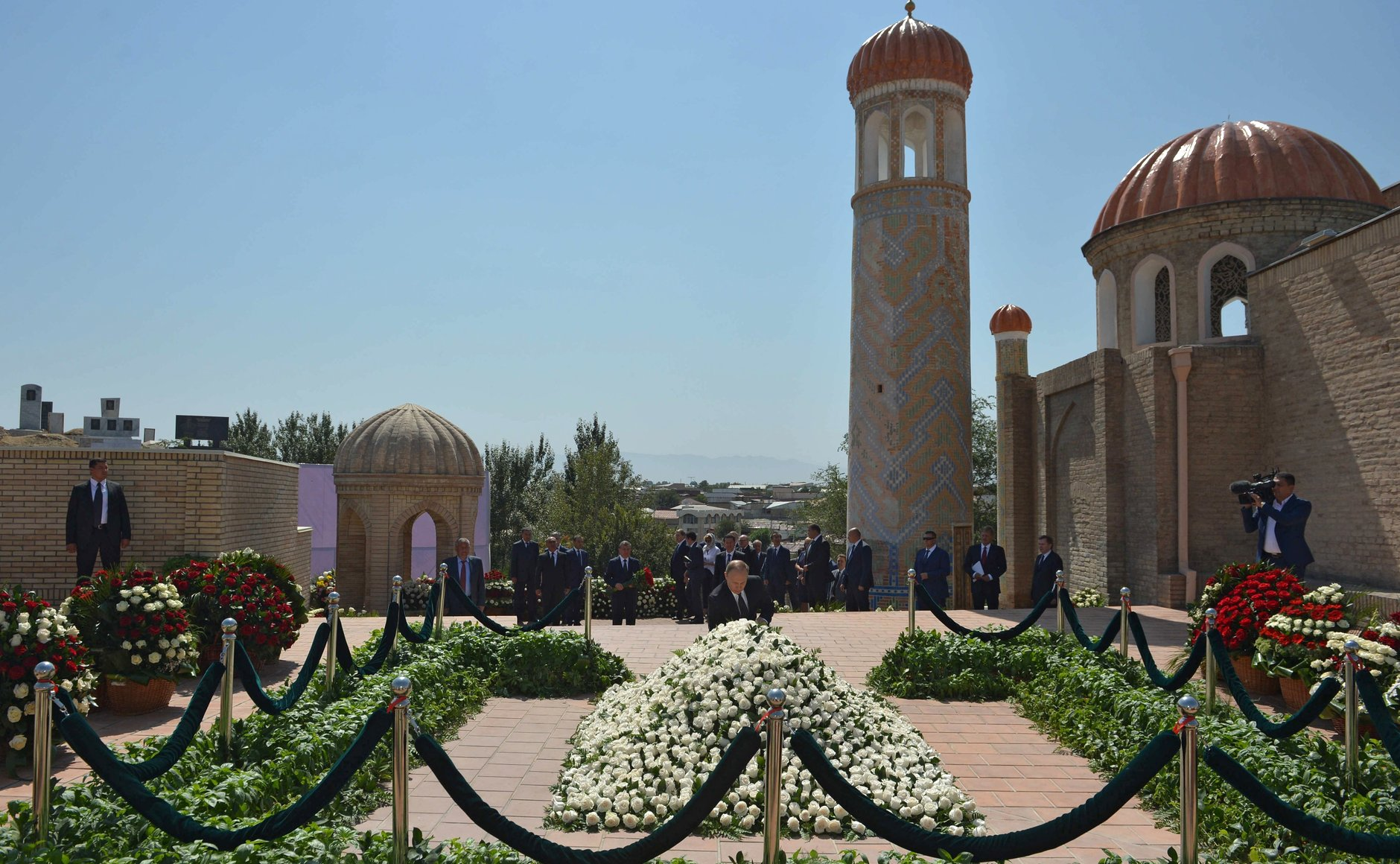
Visit of Vladimir Putin to the mausoleum

The first mention of the mosque dates back to the time when the Arabs conquered Sogd (early 8th century). According to legends, in 712, after the troops of Qutayba ibn Muslim captured Samarkand, the Arabs tried to flood the city fortress by blocking the canal of Juy-i Arziz with a dam. But a large white bird fell from the sky and broke the dam. To commemorate this event, one of Qutayba's companions, Muhammad ibn Vaso, built the “Hazrat Khizr” mosque on the site of a Zoroastrian temple that was revered by the Sogdians, at the southern gate of Afrasiab. The mosque was completely destroyed during the Mongol invasion of Central Asia in 1220.

The present mosque was built in 1854 on the site of the ancient foundation. In 1884, the building underwent decoration and reconstruction works. In 1899, the mosque's veranda was rebuilt and a portal was added. The reconstruction was completed in 1919 by the famous Samarkand master Abduqodir bin Boqiy, who installed the entrance portal and the eastern minaret, and covered the portal with a dome.

== Architecture ==
The mosque consists of a khanqah, two side rooms, auxiliary rooms, a warehouse, and a minaret; later, an additional veranda (1899) and a portal (1919) were added to the building. The main entrance is through a wooden door decorated with carvings, which leads to a small room. The portal is arched and domed, with two corner towers topped with ribbed domes; the arch is decorated with muqarnas. On the left side of the arch, there is a charming veranda with five wooden columns and a carved ceiling, decorated with colorful patterns and skillfully made plaster carvings. The veranda leads to the khanqah, which is covered with a high dome with eight ribs and a lantern. The exterior of the dome is decorated with tiles. The portal and the minaret are decorated with carved bricks, and the portal's dome has arched windows. The building was restored in the 1990s.

== Islam Karimov Mausoleum ==
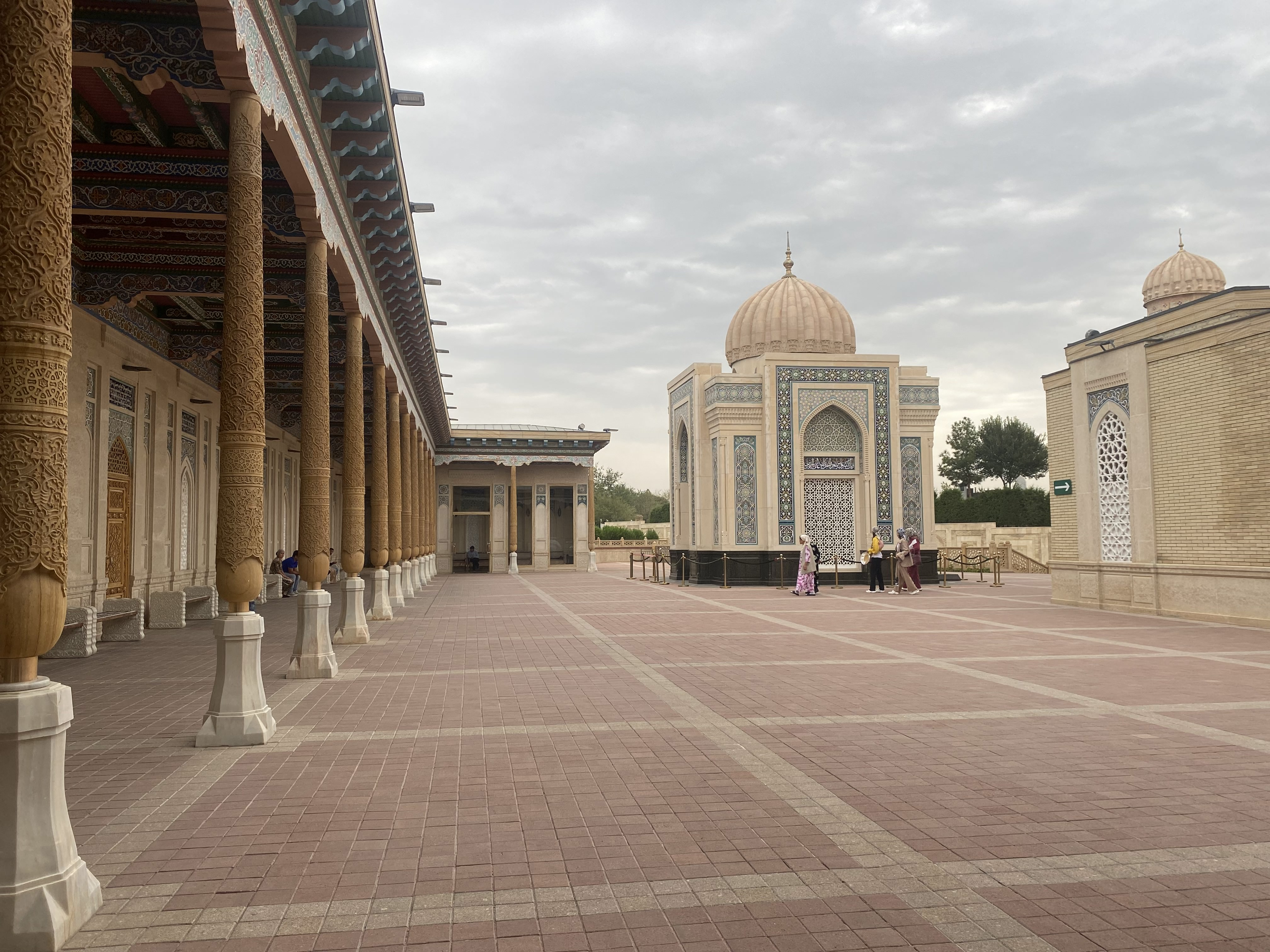
Islam Karimov Mausoleum

On September 3, 2016, the First President of Uzbekistan Islam Abduganiyevich Karimov was buried in the territory of the “Hazrat Khizr” mosque. Soon after the burial ceremony, the Main Department for the Preservation and Use of Cultural Heritage Objects under the Ministry of Culture of Uzbekistan began to develop a project for the construction of a mausoleum over the President's grave. The main difficulty in working on the project was that the Hazrat Khizr mosque was under the auspices of UNESCO. Therefore, it was not only necessary to combine two buildings from different periods in a single architectural style, but also to preserve the historical appearance of the world heritage object.

About 2000 people, including master-decorators from India, participated in the construction of the mausoleum. The construction was planned to be completed by September 2017, but at the last moment it was decided to open it on the occasion of the 80th anniversary of Islam Karimov's birth. On January 30, 2018, the mausoleum was solemnly opened and its first visitor was the current President of Uzbekistan Shavkat Mirziyoyev.
