= Salman al-Murshid =

Syrian Alawite religious figure (1907–1946)

- سلمان المرشد

Personal life
- Born: 1907 Jawbat Burghal, Latakia Sanjak, Ottoman Syria
- Died: December 16, 1946 (aged 38–39) Marjeh Square, Damascus, Syria
- Cause of death: Executed by hanging
- Children: Muhammad "Fatih"; Mujib (born 1930, assassinated 1952); Saji (born 1931, died 1998); Nur al-Mudhi' (born 1944, died 2015)
- Known for: founder of Murshidism

Religious life
- Religion: Murshidi

Salman al-Murshid (Note: Arabic: سلمان المرشد) (1907 – 16 December 1946) was a Syrian religious figure whom was the founder of Murshidism, an offshoot of Alawism.

== Early life ==
Salman al-Murshid was born to an Alawite family in the village of Jawbat Burghal, in the Latakia Sanjak. His emerging power and preaching of Murshidism worried both local notable Alawite families and the French authorities, who arranged to have him and some of his followers sent to Raqqa in exile in the mid-1920s. Yet when al-Murshid returned, he managed to patch up his problems with local notables.

In 1937, he became a member of the Chamber of Deputies, now the People's Assembly, and avoided the separatist approach advocated for by some among Syria's minority groups. Yet once it appeared that the French would not make good on their promise to grant Syria independence in 1936, al-Murshid began to call for independence again. In 1943, he was elected once more as a member of the Chamber of Deputies.

In 1944, under British instigation, al-Murshid was arrested in Beirut and kept in Damascus under house arrest for a few months.

The Syrian government tried to charge him with treason and other civil charges, but they could not prove any of the charges. Hence, the Judge received a direct order from the president, Shukri al-Quwatli, to convict Salman by any means, and he was executed on 16 December 1946 in Marjeh Square in Damascus.

== Murshidism ==
His movement respected al-Murshid and, following his death, his sons Mujib and Saji. His second son Mujib al-Murshid was killed by Abd Elhak Shihada (Arabic: عبد الحق شحادة), a military police commander under direct orders from Adib Shishakli on 27 November 1952. Murshidis were persecuted by the Syrian government until Hafez al-Assad came to power after a coup d'etat in 1970. After the 1984 confrontation between Hafez al-Assad and his younger brother Rifaat al-Assad, the al-Murshid family was allowed to return to the Latakia region. Murshidites soldiers in Rifaat's Defense Companies (Sarāyā ad-Difāʿ) had sided with Hafez in the confrontation. The movement suffered another loss in 1998 with the passing of Saji al-Murshid, leaving Salman al-Murshid's followers without a clear spiritual leader.

His movement's followers only exist in Syria, where they mostly spread out in Latakia Governorate, Homs Governorate, Al-Ghab Plain and Damascus. Their numbers may vary from 300 to 500,000 adherents. They celebrate a festival called "Joy in God" for three days, starting from 25 August of each year. In these three days, people make private prayers, dress well and offer desserts as a way of celebration.
