= Gamal Abdel Nasser Mosque =

Mosque in Cairo, Egypt

- Arabic: مسجد جمال عبد الناصر
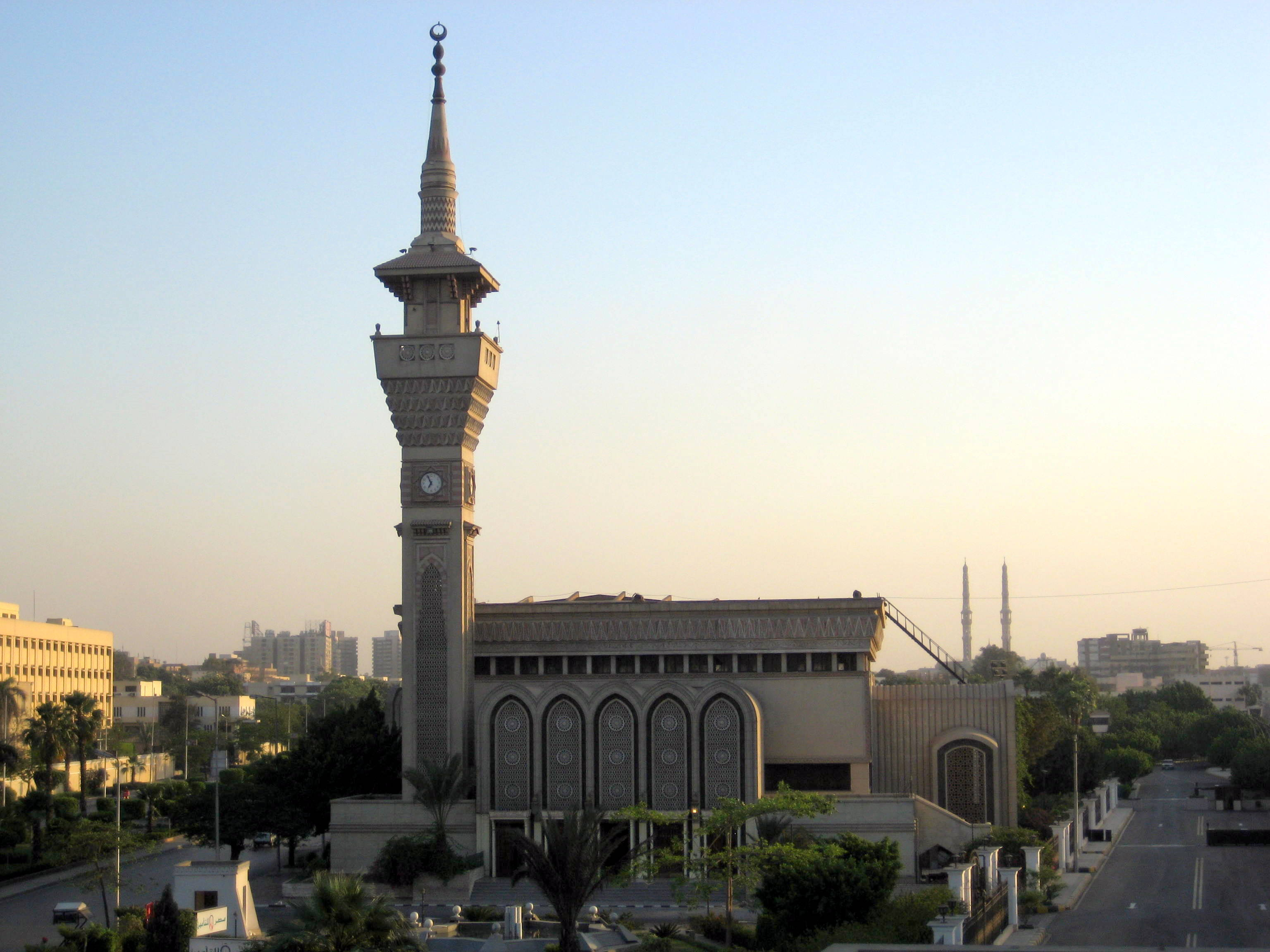

- Location of the mosque in the Nile Delta

Religion
- Affiliation: Islam
- Ecclesiastical or organizational status: Mosque; Mausoleum
- Status: Active

Location
- Municipality: El Qobbah, Cairo
- Country: Egypt
- Interactive map of Gamal Abdel Nasser Mosque
- Coordinates: 30°05′00″N 31°17′40″E

Architecture
- Type: Mosque architecture
- Style: Modern Arabic
- Groundbreaking: 1962
- Completed: 1965
- Construction cost: EGP 300,000
- Minaret: One

The Gamal Abdel Nasser Mosque (Arabic: مسجد جمال عبد الناصر, romanized: Masjid Jamāl ʻAbd al-Nāṣir) is a mosque in Cairo, Egypt. The mosque is known for containing the mausoleum of Gamal Abdel Nasser.

== Overview ==
It is located in El Qobbah district and as such, it is often referred to as "El-Qobbah Mosque". It is situated close to the building of the Ministry of Defence and Military Production, and the campus of Ain Shams University. Construction of the mosque begun in 1962, with the donation of the citizens of El Qobbah. In 1965, Nasser ordered the completion of the construction by financing the cost and supervising the design, which employs the Modern Arabic architectural style. The construction cost reached EGP 300,000. Several social activities take place in the mosque, including the Qur'anic learning, training for orphan girls and medical clinic.

== See also ==
- Islam in Egypt
- List of mosques in Egypt
