= Al-Fakhurah =

Village in Syria

Al-Fakhurah الفاخورة
- Village
- Location in Syria
- Coordinates: 35°29′43″N 36°0′25″E
- Country: Syria
- Governorate: Latakia
- District: Qardaha
- Subdistrict: al-Fakhurah Subdistrict

Population (2004)
  - Total: 389
- Time zone: UTC+3 (EET)
  - Summer (DST): UTC+2 (EEST)
- City Qrya Pcode: C3843

Al-Fakhurah (Arabic: الفاخورة) is a Syrian village in the Qardaha District in Latakia Governorate. According to the Syria Central Bureau of Statistics (CBS), Al-Fakhurah had a population of 389 in the 2004 census.
