= Qardaha =

al-Qardaha القَرْدَاحَة
- Town
- Location in Syria
- Coordinates: 35°27′26″N 36°03′35″E
- Country: Syria
- Governorate: Latakia
- District: Qardaha
- Subdistrict: Qardaha
- Elevation: 420 m (1,380 ft)

Population (2004)
  - Total: 8,671
- Time zone: UTC+3 (AST)

Qardaha (Arabic: القَرْدَاحَة, romanized: Qardāḥah) is a town in northwestern Syria, in the mountains overlooking the coastal town of Latakia. Nearby localities include Kilmakho to the west, Bustan al-Basha to the southwest, Harf al-Musaytirah to the southeast and Muzayraa to the north. According to the Syrian Central Bureau of Statistics, Qardaha had a population of 8,671 in 2004. It has a predominantly Alawite population and is the traditional home of the Assad family, which ruled Syria from 1970 until 2024.

Syrian President Hafez al-Assad, who ruled from 1970 to 2000, was born in Qardaha. Under Assad, the government poured massive investments into Qardaha, Latakia and the surrounding region. Qardaha has many luxurious villas. A major statue of Hafez al-Assad used to exist in the town center, and a huge mausoleum containing the graves of Bassel al-Assad and Hafez al-Assad was also previously located there. Hasan al-Khayer was also born in Qardaha.

== Climate and geography ==
Qardaha has a hot-summer Mediterranean climate (Köppen climate classification: Csa). Qardaha is in a mountainous area, but its altitude is only between 350 and 500 meters. It is in a beautiful forested area. Qardaha has much rainfall. The average high temperature in July is 29 °C, and in January is 7 °C. There is nearly 828 mm of rainfall annually and three days of snow in January. The climate and nature in Qardaha favour agriculture, and there are apple and orange plantations and tobacco farms.

Climate data for Qardaha
Month	Jan	Feb	Mar	Apr	May	Jun	Jul	Aug	Sep	Oct	Nov	Dec	Year
Mean daily maximum °C (°F)	7 (45)	11 (52)	15 (59)	19 (66)	24 (75)	28 (82)	29 (84)	28 (82)	26 (79)	23 (73)	17 (63)	10 (50)	20 (68)
Mean daily minimum °C (°F)	3 (37)	6 (43)	6 (43)	8 (46)	13 (55)	17 (63)	20 (68)	20 (68)	17 (63)	15 (59)	9 (48)	5 (41)	12 (53)
Average precipitation mm (inches)	182 (7.2)	119 (4.7)	63 (2.5)	40 (1.6)	29 (1.1)	6 (0.2)	4 (0.2)	1 (0.0)	37 (1.5)	79 (3.1)	90 (3.5)	178 (7.0)	828 (32.6)
Average rainy days (≥ 1 mm)	16	14	11	8	4	1	1	1	4	7	11	14	92
Average snowy days (≥ 1 cm)	3	1	0	0	0	0	0	0	0	0	0	1	5

Source #3 Climate Zone (Rainy and snowy days)

== History ==
According to written traditions, the residents of Qardaha descended from the Kalbiyya tribal confederation and the town served as the confederation's principal center. During the late Ottoman era, between 1840 and 1880, tensions between the authorities and the Alawite tribes of the coastal mountains increased sharply. In 1854 the Ottoman governor of the Latakia Sanjak ("Latakia District") was killed in an armed confrontation between the authorities and members of the Qardaha-based tribe. This emboldened the Kalbiyya fighters, who proceeded to launch more raids against Ottoman positions, which the authorities responded to harshly.

Fear of attracting the attention and subjugation of the authorities, and avoiding taxation and military conscription, was one of the reasons many of the Alawite fellahin ("peasants") who lived in the vicinity of Qardaha, opted not to establish an agglomeration of settlement. Until the present day, Qardaha is surrounded by scattered rural hamlets. The town formerly had a significant Christian population until the mid to late 20th-century, when most Christian families left for the major coastal cities.

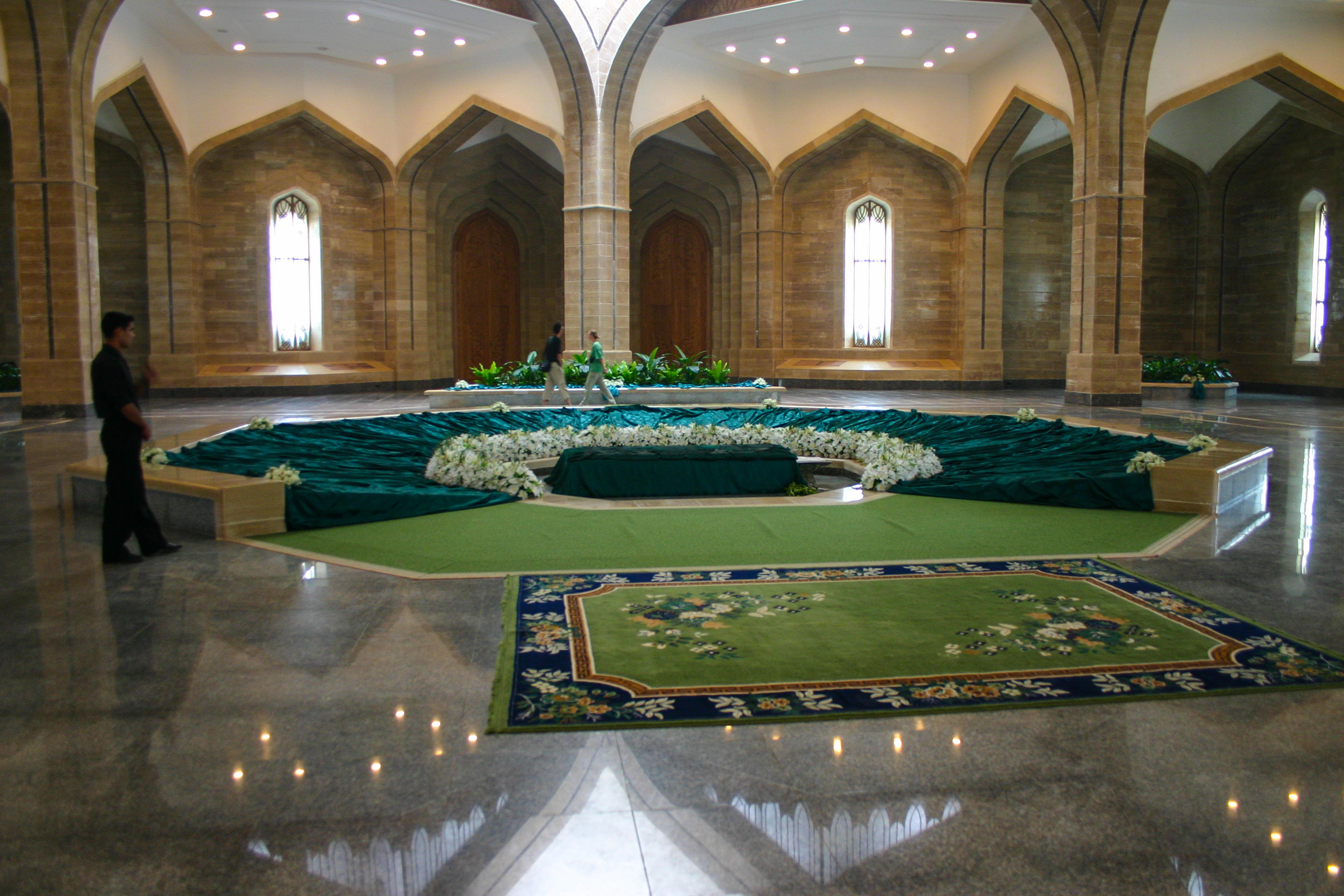
The interior of Assad Mausoleum before its destruction, with the main tomb in the center

In 1970, Qardaha was given city status, along with al-Shaykh Badr and Duraykish. Together they made up around 6% of the total urban population of the two coastal governorates, Latakia and Tartus. The three towns were also designated the seats of newly formed districts (mantiqah) centered around them. According to French anthropologist Fabrice Balanche, the Ba'athist government which gained power in the 1960s, displayed a degree of favoritism for the three towns, all of which were Alawite, and Qardaha specifically. He particularly pointed to the fact that the subdistricts (nahiya) of al-Qadmus and Mashta al-Helu, predominantly Ismaili and Christian, respectively, were slated to become districts when each of their populations passed the 60,000 threshold, although the subdistricts of Qardaha, al-Shaykh Badr and Duraykish all had less than 40,000 inhabitants. The opening of civil and administrative services associated with its city status and state investments, such as the construction of a tobacco processing plant, spurred Qardaha's significant growth between 1970 and 1981, with an annual average of 4.9% compared to the coastal region's average of 3.8%.

In early October 2012 during the Syrian civil war, Mohammad al-Assad, cousin of President Bashar al-Assad and leader of the local Shabiha, was wounded after a gunfight in the town with a member of the rival Alawite Khayyir clan. This was sparked by a discussion about the earlier detention at Damascus airport of Abdel-Aziz Khayyer, a Qardaha native and member of the latter clan. On 24 April 2013, the village was attacked with a barrage of rockets launched by rebels. In early August 2013 in a surprise offensive, rebel fighters advanced south to the outskirts of the village of Aramo, 20 km. (12 miles) from Qardaha. One of the attackers stated "The objective is to reach Qardaha and hurt them like they are hurting us."

On 11 December 2024, the tombs of Hafez al-Assad and Bassel al-Assad were set on fire by rebel fighters.

== Sources ==
- Balanche, Fabrice (2000). "Les Alaouites, l'espace et le pouvoir dans la région côtière syrienne : une intégration nationale ambiguë" (in French). Tours: Université François Rabelais.
