= Qardaha District =

Qardaha District منطقة القرداحة
- District
- Map of Qardaha District within Latakia Governorate
- Coordinates (Qardaha): 35.45°N 36°E
- Country: Syria
- Governorate: Latakia
- Seat: Qardaha
- Subdistricts: 4 nawāḥī

Area
  - Total: 360.91 km^{2} (139.35 sq mi)

Population (2004)
  - Total: 75,279
  - Density: 208.58/km^{2} (540.22/sq mi)
- Geocode: SY0604

Qardaha District (Arabic: منطقة القرداحة, romanized: manṭiqat al-Qardāḥah) is a district of the Latakia Governorate in northwestern Syria. Administrative centre is the city of Qardaha. At the 2004 census, the district had a population of 75,279.

== Sub-districts ==
The district of Qardaha is divided into four sub-districts or nawāḥī (population as of 2004):

- Qardaha Subdistrict (ناحية القرداحة): population 44,510
- Harf al-Musaytirah Subdistrict (ناحية حرف المسيترة): population 6,669
- Al-Fakhurah Subdistrict (ناحية الفاخورة): population 18,357
- Jawbat Burghal Subdistrict (ناحية جوبة برغال): population 5,743
