= Wadi Barada offensive (2016–2017) =

Military operation against rebel-held villages by the Syrian Army

- Part of the Rif Dimashq Governorate campaign and Hezbollah involvement in the Syrian Civil War
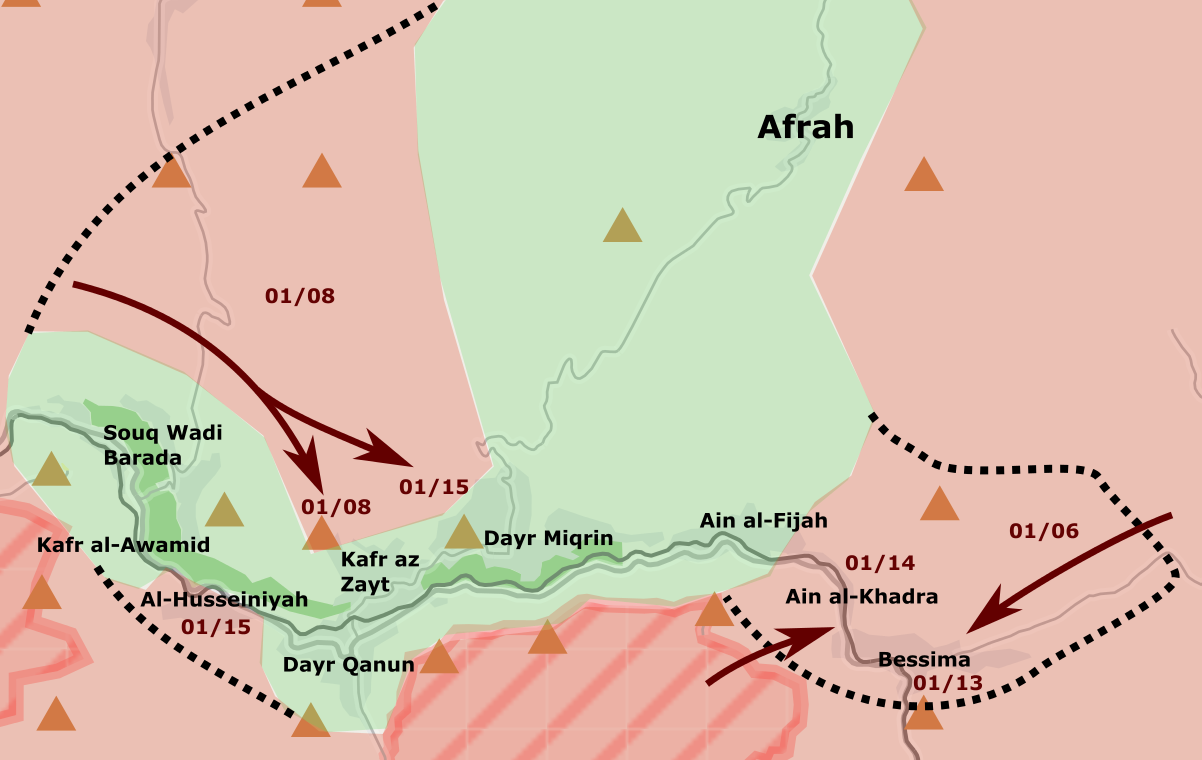
- Government advances in Wadi Barada between 6 and 15 January 2017.
Date	23 December 2016 – 29 January 2017 (1 month and 6 days)
Location	Wadi Barada, al-Zabadani District, Rif Dimashq Governorate, Syria
Result	Decisive Syrian Army and allies victory: Syrian Army captures the Barada river valley

Belligerents
(Syria) Syrian Arab Republic; Russia (from 2017); Hezbollah; Galilee Forces	Ahrar al-Sham; Jaysh al-Islam (Syrian opposition) Free Syrian Army; Al-Nusra Front

Commanders and leaders
(Syria) Brig. Gen. Ali Mahmoud (leading operations commander) (Syria) Col. Ghiath Dalla (leading operations co-commander); Gen. Maher al-Assad (4th Armoured Division commander); Brig. Gen. Ahmad Ghadban † (Syrian Army commander & chief negotiator)	Abu al-Baraa (Hassan Soufan) (Ahrar al-Sham commander) (Syrian opposition) Col. Hammoud Douka † (FSA top commander)

Units involved
Syrian Armed Forces; Syrian Army; 4th Armoured Division; 42nd Brigade; Republican Guard; Rocket Battalion; Qalamoun Shield Forces; National Defence Forces; Syrian Air Force; Russian Armed Forces; Russian Air Force	(Syrian opposition) Free Syrian Army; Saraya Ahl al-Sham; Western Qalamoun Union; Levant Liberation Army; Martyr Mohammed Qassem Brigade; Abdal al-Sham; Zabandani Hawks Brigade; Ahrar al-Sham; Al-Hamza Battalion; Joint Defence Alliance

Strength
5,000+	2,000+ (as of 1 January 2017); 500 (pro-government claim, after 26 January 2017)

Casualties and losses
7+ killed (January 2017)	Unknown killed 700 surrendered (SOHR claim); 2,600 surrendered (government claim)
- 21+ civilians killed, 23 wounded (December 2016, January 2017); 50,000 displaced

The Wadi Barada offensive (2016–2017) was a military operation against rebel-held villages in the Barada River valley by the Syrian Army and allied forces, including pro-government militias and Lebanese Hezbollah between December 2016 and January 2017. The Barada River valley includes the village of Ain al-Fijah which holds a water spring that provides drinking water to towns throughout the Rif Dimashq Governorate. During the offensive, a Government airstrike temporarily destroyed the spring, in what the United Nations has called a "war crime".

== Background ==
Syrian rebels affiliated with the Free Syrian Army captured the village of Souq Wadi Barada in February 2012. Engineers and technicians who worked at the water spring remained in place. After the rebel capture of Wadi Barada, government forces imposed a siege on the villages, with the UN and humanitarian assistance being repeatedly denied access to the locality between 2014 and 2017.

In July 2016, Syrian government forces advanced into the village of Harira in the Barada Valley. In response, the al-Nusra Front executed 14 prisoners of war on 20 July. By 3 August, Syrian government and Hezbollah forces captured Harira.

== The offensive ==
Area of the offensive is contained within the hatched box.

On 23 December 2016, alleging that rebels were polluting the water spring in Ain al-Fijah with diesel fuel, government forces conducted airstrikes and shelling on Wadi Barada. The U.N.'s Independent International Commission of Inquiry on Syria found no evidence of deliberate contamination of the water supply or demolition by the rebels, as the Syrian government maintained at the time, and no reports water contamination prior to the government's two air strikes on 23 December, and said these strikes cut off water from Damascus. The open source investigative website Bellingcat identified a video showing bombs impacting the building housing the spring.

On 26 December, following airstrikes, the Syrian Army advanced into the valley from its outskirts and cliffs. 10 villages in the area were still held by the rebels. The opposition accused the government forces of targeting Ain al-Fijah and nearby villages with barrel bombs, leading to severe damage of the spring.

On 1 January 2017, pro-government website Al-Masdar reported that the Syrian Army entered Ayn al-Fijah after civilians were evacuated by the Syrian Arab Red Crescent. Heavy clashes in the town continued on the next day, as local Jabhat Fateh al-Sham defenders attempted to halt the army and Hezbollah's advance, according to the UK-based Syrian Observatory for Human Rights (SOHR).

On 3 January, according to social media posts and SOHR, rebels stated that they would let teams enter and fix the spring as long as the government would honor the ceasefire and lift the siege. Pro-government media reported that the government called for the rebels to surrender the water spring and restore the water supply for Damascus, and government forces proceeded to launch another attack on the following day, targeting the rebel-held village of Basimah, capturing several sites around the village, including Basimah Orphanage, which they claimed was used as rebel base, while the SAA and Hezbollah ambushed what government sources described as Jabhat Fateh al-Sham fighters crossing from Lebanon into Syria, resulting in some casualties with the rest retreating to Arsal Municipality of the Beqa'a Governorate.

On 6 January, pro-government media reported that the 4th Armoured Division under Maher al-Assad's command arrived in Wadi Barada to aid the government offensive, and that the army then captured all hills overlooking Basimah. Later that day, pro-government media claimed that a ceasefire deal had been reached.

By 8 January, the government forces resumed their offensive, with al-Masdar saying they captured the hills northwest of Deir Maqran, most importantly Tal Dahr Al-Masabi. On 10 January, al-Masdar said that Russian Air Force conducted airstrikes against rebels in the area for the first time, while the Syrian Army also bombarded targets near the villages of Basimah and Deir Maqran.

Multiple eyewitnesses told Human Rights Watch that the bombardment of Basimah included the use of chemical weapons: "they smelled chlorine and described clinical signs and symptoms consistent with exposure to chlorine gas". The attacks took place in a civilian neighbourhood with no opposition armed presence and resulted in 46 civilians being treated in hospital for chemical weapons exposure.

Around 12 January, SOHR reported, the government flag was raised in Ayn al-Fijah, Basimah, and other villages, whereupon these settlements, with reports of "reconciliation" agreements made with local notables to enable the government to take control of the water supply, including the transfer of fighters to their stronghold of Idlib Governorate. Several rebels continued to resist and attempted to keep control of the settlements. By then, about 50,000 residents of the valley had been displaced due to the fighting.

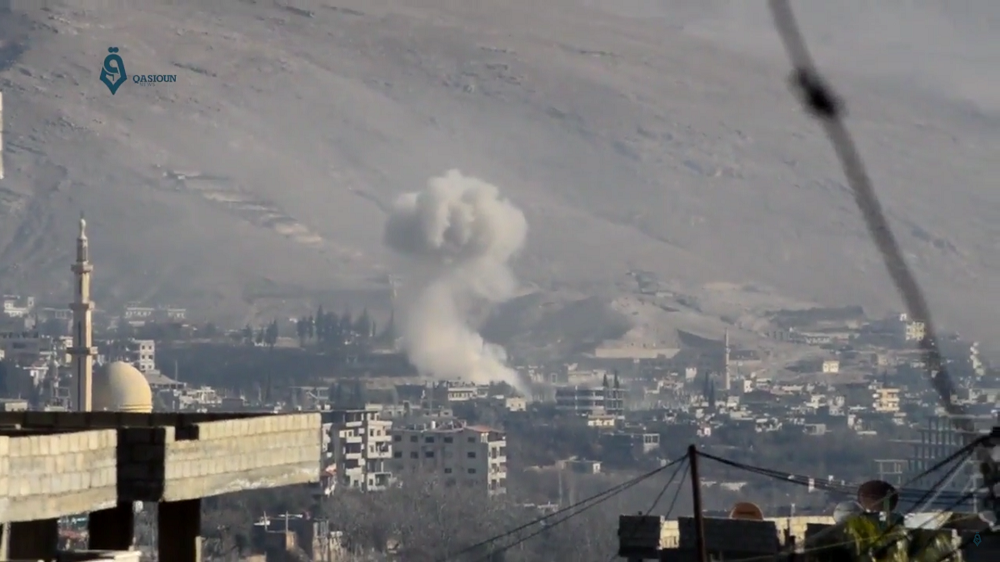
The Syrian Air Force launches an airstrike on a village in Wadi Barada.

On 13 January, government media reported that Basimah was captured by pro-government forces, and that they advanced into Ain al-Khadra. According to opposition sources, rebel forces managed to retake Ain al-Khadra soon after. Later that day, government media asserted that Ain al-Fijah, Kafr al-Awamid, Souq Wadi Barada, Dayr Qanoo, Dayr Miqrin and Kafr az Zaytsigned a reconciliation agreement with the government, allowing technicians to fix the water springs and to raise the government flag over the towns. Several rebel units continued fighting, with government media reporting they attacked the technical crews with rockets.

On late 14 January, government media said that maintenance vehicles arrived at the Ain Al-Fijah springs, along with some buses to transport rebels to Idlib Governorate. Later that day, however, government media reported that a sniper killed the Syrian Army general and chief negotiator Ahmad Ghadban as he was returning to the government lines. Though the rebels subsequently said they had nothing to do with Ghadban's death, government forces declared they would resume the offensive. The army consequently launched another assault on Ain al-Khadra in the following night, and captured the village. On the next day, Hezbollah-led forces advanced into the outskirts of Ain Al-Fijah and captured the hill of Ra’s al-Sirah to the town's north, resulting in fierce fighting with rebel fighters. On the other side, government media reported that the Syrian Army took control of most of Al-Husseiniyah after the local elders agreed to a ceasefire deal with the government. Nevertheless, some parts of the town remained outside government control as some rebels reportedly refused to surrender or leave.

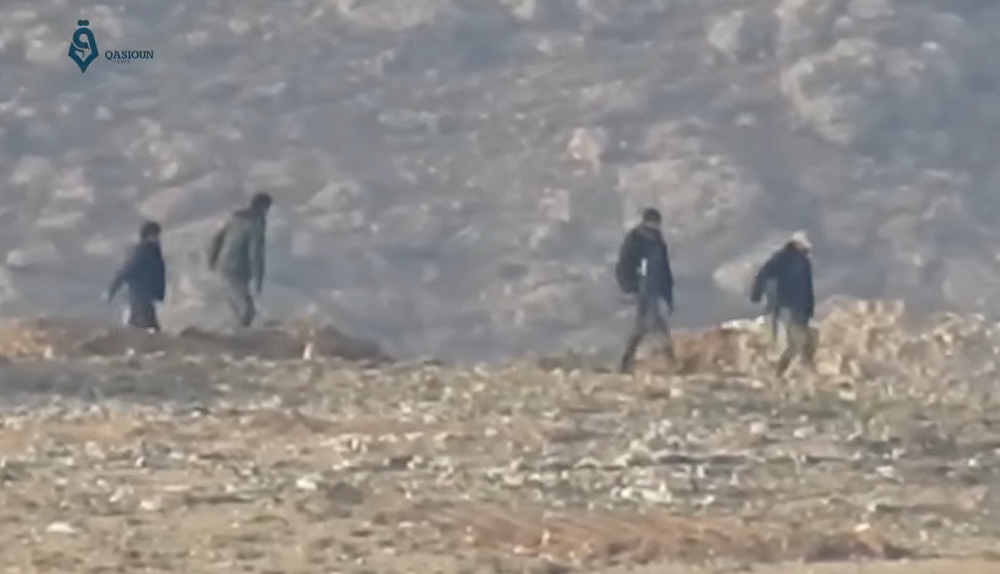
A NDF patrol near the frontlines in Wadi Barada during late January 2016.

Over the next days Hezbollah and army units slowly advanced into Ain Al-Fijah. On 19 January, government forces captured the village of Afrah. Later that day, representatives of the local rebels and the government agreed to another ceasefire and to attempt to enforce the peace deal that the involved parties had agreed upon before Ahmad Ghadban's death, though this agreement, too, quickly collapsed, with both sides resuming hostilities. The rebels consequently blamed Hezbollah for the failure of the peace process, saying that the government could not restrain the Lebanese fighters. On 26 January, al-Masdar News reported that another agreement had been reached between the government and the opposition fighters, with 2,600 rebels reportedly surrendering, leaving about 500 militants continuing to resist the pro-government takeover of Wadi Barada. SOHR reported on the next day that fighting for Ain Al-Fijah continued unabated.

On 28 January, however, SOHR and al-Masdar reported that the rebels finally retreated from Ain Al-Fijah as "goodwill gesture" for the implementation of the peace agreement of 26 January. The army subsequently took control of the town, and said the remaining opposition forces in the valley would be allowed to leave for Idlib Governorate.

A day later, the Army took full control of Wadi Barada, and the water supply to Greater Damascus was restored. Later on, the first buses carrying rebels left for Idlib, while al-Masdar News reported that some Jabhat Fatah al-Sham fighters attacked other opposition groups in Kafr az Zayt due to disagreements over the ceasefire.

== Talks for ceasefire and evacuation ==
On 29 December, Syrian government and opposition delegations agreed on talks to achieve a ceasefire at Wadi Barada. Rebels from both the FSA and Jabhat Fatah al-Sham would be given free passage to the Idlib Governorate in exchange of the rebel surrender of Wadi Barada west of Damascus. If so, al-Zabadani and Madaya would be isolated and could be used by the Syrian government to press for another ceasefire and evacuation.

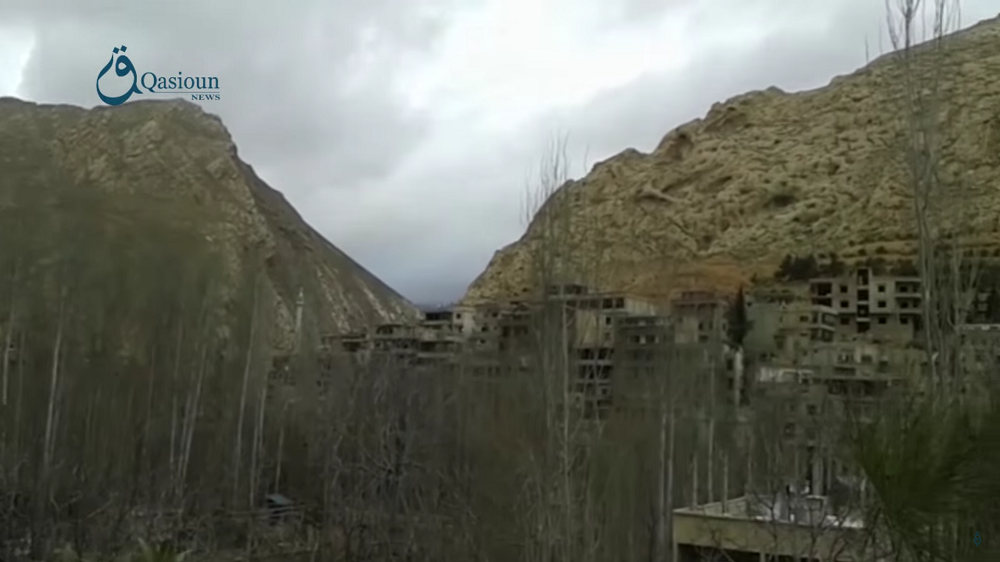
A village in the valley.

On 6 January, Hezbollah reportedly proposed a ceasefire but was rejected by Ahrar al-Sham, which claimed that the government had earlier rejected a ceasefire which would allow the repair of a water pumping station according to them damaged by airstrikes. Around 5.5 million people around Damascus had little to no access to running water for two weeks as a result of the conflict. Despite this, an agreement for a truce was reportedly still reached on the same day; according to the new deal maintenance workshops would be granted access to fix the damaged water spring, and local militants would handle over their medium and heavy weaponry and would be enrolled in local committees. Those who refused to have their status settled, would be transported to Idlib.

On 13 January, Ain al-Fijah, Kafr al-Awamid, Souq Wadi Barada, Dayr Qanoo, Dayr Miqrin and Kafr az Zayt signed a deal with the government under Russian mediation, with SOHR reporting the following contents: (1) Exemption of locals from army service for six months; (2) delivery of most arms to the government; (3) wanted locals are allowed to settle their conditions with government security agencies; (4) no armed presence around the towns is allowed; (5) non-native rebels are sent to Idlib; (6) all rebels who want to voluntarily leave the valley for Idlib are allowed to do so; (7) the military is not allowed to enter the homes of locals; (8) the military can set up checkpoints within the towns, at their entrances, and along the main roads; (9) locals and former rebels are allowed to join the National Defence Forces; (10) expelled employees in the valley can return to their jobs. These negotiations broke down following the death of the Syrian government's chief negotiator. Another attempt to enforce this agreement was made on 19 January, which also quickly broke down. The International Meeting on Syrian Settlement was then held in Astana, Kazakhstan as part of the peace process, where Bashar Jaafari, the U.N. envoy representing the Syrian government, announced that the ceasefire that began in December 2016 did not apply to the Barada region because of a terrorist presence. On 26 January it was reported by pro-government media that over 2,600 militants had laid down their arms, most returning to civilian life or joining self-defense units.

In 2018, following the capture of the area by Government forces, Human Rights Watch accused the Syrian Government of "unlawfully preventing displaced residents from former anti-government-held areas from returning to their properties".

== International reactions ==
- United Nations: The U.N. Independent International Commission of Inquiry on Syria claimed that it had found no evidence of deliberate contamination of the Wadi Barada water supply or demolition by rebels, and instead accused the Syrian Air Force of having deliberately bombed the water sources in December 2016. The commission said that "the attack amounts to the war crime of attacking objects indispensable for the survival of the civilian population, and further violated the principle of proportionality in attacks". Jan Egeland, head of the Norwegian Refugee Council in Geneva, stated that "To sabotage and deny water is of course a war crime, because it is civilians who drink it and civilians who will be affected by waterborne diseases if supplies are not restored".
