= Wadi Barada =

River valley in Syria

Wadi Barada (Arabic: وادي بردى) is a river valley in southwestern Syria. The valley is home to 17 villages and towns.

== Etymology ==
The word wadi (وادي) means valley in Arabic. "Barada" is thought to be derived from the word barid (بارد), which means "cold" in Semitic languages. The ancient Greek name (Greek: Χρυσορρόας, translit. Chrysorrhoas), means "streaming with gold". The river has also suffered from severe drought in the last decades, mainly due to the lower rainfall rates and the large increase in the population in the area.

== Geography ==
Wadi Barada is located in the north-western part of the Syrian capital of Damascus, in the Qalamoun district. It is known for being a mountainous area and in direct contact with the eastern mountain range of Lebanon. The Barada River is located in the western suburb of Damascus, it is 84 km long, stems from Zabadani, and drains in Al Otaiba Lake. The region also has a main water source. The water of Ein Fajja in the Barada valley is a major source of the capital, providing drinking water to more than six million people in Damascus and its countryside.

== Villages and towns of Wadi Barada ==
The following villages and towns make up Wadi Barada. The population numbers are according to the Central Bureau of Statistics (CBS) for 2004.

English name	Arabic Name	Population	Subdistrict
Souq Wadi Barada	سوق وادي بردى	3,678	al-Zabadani
Kafr al-Awamid	كفر العواميد	1,588	al-Zabadani
Barheliya	برهليا	821	al-Zabadani
Hurayra	هريرة	2,455	Madaya
al-Husseiniyah	الحسينية	1,563	Ain al-Fijah
Deir Qanun	دير قانون	4,213	Ain al-Fijah
Kfeir al-Zayt	كفير الزيت	4,170	Ain al-Fijah
Deir Muqaran	دير مقرن	4,803	Ain al-Fijah
Efra	افرة	1,029	Ain al-Fijah
Ain al-Fijah	عين الفيجة	3,806	Ain al-Fijah
Basimah	بسيمة	2,812	Qudsaya
Ashrafiyat al-Wadi	أشرفية الوادي	2,101	Qudsaya
Jdeidat al-Wadi	جديدة الوادي	5,227	Qudsaya
Jamraya	جمرايا	1,156	Qudsaya
al-Hamah	الهامة	10,045	Qudsaya
Qudsaya	قدسيا	33,571	Qudsaya
Dummar	دمر	96,962	Damascus

== Syrian civil war ==
Syrian rebels captured the village of Ain al-Fijah in February 2012. Engineers and technicians who worked at the water spring remained in place. After the rebel capture of Wadi Barada, government forces imposed a blockade on the villages. The army retook control of the town on 28 January 2017 and the next day the Army took full control of Wadi Barada.

== See also ==
- Barada
