= Rawda =

الرَّوضَة ar-Rawḍa is an Arabic word meaning garden, meadow, or kindergarten. It is used in many place names in the Arab World. It can be transliterated variously as Rawda, Roda, Roḍa, Rawḍa, among other transliterations. It is also used as a feminine given name.

== Given name ==
- Rawda al-Haj (born 1969), Sudanese poet
- Rawda Al-Farkh Al-Hudhud (born 1946), Jordanian writer
- Rawdah Mohamed, Norwegian-Somali model

== Places ==
=== Bahrain ===
- Al Rawda Palace, a palace in western Bahrain

=== Egypt ===
- Rawda Island, an island on the Nile in Cairo
- Al-Rawda, North Sinai

=== Kuwait ===
- Rawda, Kuwait, a Kuwaiti area and a suburb of Kuwait City.

=== Saudi Arabia ===
- Rawdah, Medina, an area of the Nabawi Mosque in Medina
- Al Rawdah Sub-Municipality, a sub-municipality of Riyadh

=== Syria ===
- Al-Rawda, Hama, a village near Hama
- Al-Rawda, Tartus, a town in the Tartus Governorate
- Al-Rawda (tell), a Bronze Age archaeological site near Hama
- Al-Rawdah (al-Batrounah), a village in Rif Dimashq Governorate
- Rawda, Idlib, a village in Jisr al-Shughur District, Idlib
- Rawda Square in Damascus

=== Yemen ===
- Al-Rawda, Yemen, a village in Al Bayda District in the Al Bayda Governorate

== Other ==
- HMS Al Rawdah, a British prison ship
