= Serghaya =

Town in Syria

Serghaya سرغايا Sirghaya
- Town
- Location in Syria
- Coordinates: 33°47′N 36°8′E
- Country: Syria
- Governorate: Rif Dimashq
- District: al-Zabadani
- Subdistrict: Serghaya
- Elevation: 1,446 m (4,744 ft)

Population (2004 census)
  - Total: 7,501
- Area code: 11
- Climate: Csb

Serghaya or Sirghaya (Arabic: سرغايا, romanized: Saraghāyā) is a small town located in the Damascus countryside in south west Syria. According to the Syria Central Bureau of Statistics (CBS), Serghaya had a population of 7,501 in the 2004 census. Its inhabitants are predominantly Sunni Muslims.

== History ==
In 1838, Eli Smith noted that Serghaya's population was Sunni Muslim.

== Geography ==
It is 60 km (37 mi) from Damascus and 1,446 m (4,744 ft) above sea level. It is at the foot of the Anti-Lebanon Mountain. Serghaya has a moderate climate with a temperature that varies from 25 to 32 degrees Celsius all summer season and cold climate with temperature varies from -5 up to 10 all winter when snow covers the land and mountain.

It is connected to Damascus via Al-Zabadani and also has old rail reaches to Beirut via Riyaq (or Rayak), Bekaa.

Nearby Towns

- West :`Utayb (3.5 nm)
- North: Yahfufah (3.4 nm), Al Khuraybah (4.0 nm), Ma`rabun (3.4 nm)
- East: Al `Uwayni (0.4 nm)
- South: `Ayn al Hawr (2.2 nm)

=== Climate ===
In Serghaya, there is a mild summer Mediterranean climate. Rainfall is higher in winter than in summer. The Köppen-Geiger climate classification is Csb. The average annual temperature in Serghaya is 11.5 °C (52.7 °F). About 583 mm (22.95 in) of precipitation falls annually.

Climate data for Serghaya, elevation 1,400 m (4,600 ft)
Month	Jan	Feb	Mar	Apr	May	Jun	Jul	Aug	Sep	Oct	Nov	Dec	Year
Mean daily maximum °C (°F)	8.5 (47.3)	8.3 (46.9)	12.1 (53.8)	15.8 (60.4)	21.7 (71.1)	25.0 (77.0)	28.1 (82.6)	28.2 (82.8)	26.8 (80.2)	21.6 (70.9)	14.0 (57.2)	8.6 (47.5)	18.2 (64.8)
Daily mean °C (°F)	3.0 (37.4)	3.0 (37.4)	6.1 (43.0)	9.6 (49.3)	13.8 (56.8)	16.7 (62.1)	18.8 (65.8)	19.0 (66.2)	17.7 (63.9)	13.1 (55.6)	7.5 (45.5)	2.4 (36.3)	10.9 (51.6)
Mean daily minimum °C (°F)	−2.5 (27.5)	−2.3 (27.9)	0.2 (32.4)	3.5 (38.3)	6.0 (42.8)	8.5 (47.3)	9.6 (49.3)	9.8 (49.6)	8.3 (46.9)	4.5 (40.1)	1.0 (33.8)	−4.0 (24.8)	3.5 (38.4)
Average precipitation mm (inches)	96 (3.8)	89 (3.5)	58 (2.3)	28 (1.1)	12 (0.5)	1 (0.0)	1 (0.0)	1 (0.0)	1 (0.0)	9 (0.4)	43 (1.7)	72 (2.8)	411 (16.1)
Source: FAO

== Economy ==
Economy for this town is based on agricultural activities and the main crops are apple, cherry, pear, peach and apricot.

== Bibliography ==
- Robinson, E.; Smith, E. (1841). Biblical Researches in Palestine, Mount Sinai and Arabia Petraea: A Journal of Travels in the year 1838. Vol. 3. Boston: Crocker & Brewster.
