= Madaya, Syria =

Town in Syria

Madaya مضايا
- Town
- Location in Syria
- Coordinates: 33°41′16″N 36°06′3″E
- Country: Syria
- Governorate: Rif Dimashq
- District: al-Zabadani
- Subdistrict: Madaya
- Elevation: 1,344 m (4,409 ft)

Population (2004 census)
  - Total: 9,371

Madaya (Arabic: مضايا, romanized: Maḍāyā) is a small mountainous town in Syria, located at an altitude of around 1,300 metres (4,300 ft). It is located about 40 kilometres (25 mi) northwest of Damascus in the Rif Dimashq Governorate. According to the Syria Central Bureau of Statistics (CBS), Madaya had a population of 9,371 in the 2004 census. Its inhabitants are predominantly Sunni Muslims. Madaya is an important summer resort in Syria, along with the nearby cities of Zabadani and Bloudan. The town's population is estimated at 15,000 in 2015.

The town's farms are famous for growing apples, cherries, and peaches, and the Barada River passes through it. It also has a number of springs and eyes that supply the town's needs, such as the Kawthar Spring and Ain Mayseh, which has made it a destination for many tourists coming from Damascus or from outside the country.

== Etymology ==
J. E. Hanauer said the name "Madaya" should be compared to the Greek mythological figure Medea.

== History ==
In 1838, Eli Smith noted that Madaya's population was Sunni Muslim.

J. E. Hanauer visited Madaya around 1909. He saw villagers preparing for winter by drying tomatoes and wheat to make bulgur, and feeding sheep with leaves before slaughtering them for preservation as "kawarma".

=== Syrian civil war (2015–2017) ===
Since July 2015, the town has been besieged by a combination of Syrian forces loyal to the Syrian president Bashar al-Assad and the allied Shia militia Hezbollah. In December 2015, Doctors Without Borders reported that 23 people had died of starvation after a total blockade prevented any food or humanitarian aid to enter since 18 October. United Nations Secretary General Ban Ki-Moon expressed alarm at the situation in Madaya as well as in other besieged areas in Syria, and warned that the use of starvation as weapon during conflict is a war crime.

On 7 January 2016, the UN Office for the Coordination of Humanitarian Affairs issued a statement calling for unimpeded access to deliver emergency assistance to Madaya, Al-Fu'ah and Kafriya. Amid calls from United Nations officials and dozens of humanitarian organizations to intervene, the United Nations negotiated a deal between the Syrian government and rebels holding the town to allow for the delivery of humanitarian aid, which was carried out on 11 January 2016.

On 14 April 2017, the 2015 Zabadani cease-fire agreement was implemented, and 60 buses transported 2,350 people, including 400 rebels, from Madaya and Zabadani to Idlib.

=== Rehabilitation (2017–present) ===
In 2017, thousands of residents returned to the town after the reconciliation was completed, as all roads were opened, which facilitated the entry of technical and service workshops to the area.

Local council began cleaning and restoring the paths, especially the tourist facilities, in addition to the return of electricity to the town. Madaya also returned as a tourist site for thousands of visitors, and the shops and the famous market were opened.

== Bibliography ==
- Robinson, E.; Smith, E. (1841). Biblical Researches in Palestine, Mount Sinai and Arabia Petraea: A Journal of Travels in the year 1838. Vol. 3. Boston: Crocker & Brewster.
