= Ahmed al-Dalati =

Syrian politician and security official (born 1985)

Brigadier General Ahmed al-Dalati
- أحمد الدالاتي

Governor of Quneitra
- In office 8 March 2025 – 31 July 2026
- President: Ahmed al-Sharaa
- Preceded by: Tony Aziz Hanna
- Succeeded by: Ghassan Elias al-Sayyed Ahmad

Commander of Internal Security in Rif Dimashq
- Incumbent
- Assumed office 2 September 2025
- President: Ahmed al-Sharaa
- Preceded by: Hussam al-Tahhan

Commander of Internal Security in Suwayda
- In office 25 May 2025 – 2 September 2025
- President: Ahmed al-Sharaa
- Succeeded by: Hussam al-Tahhan

Personal details
- Born: 1985 (age 40–41) Kfeir al-Zayt, Rif Dimashq Governorate, Syria
- Education: Technical Institute of Computer Science in Damascus (BE)
- Nickname: Abu Muhammad al-Shami (Arabic: أبو محمد الشامي)
- Military career
- Allegiance: Jaysh al-Islam (2011–‍2015); Ahrar al-Sham (2015–‍2025); Syria (since 2024)
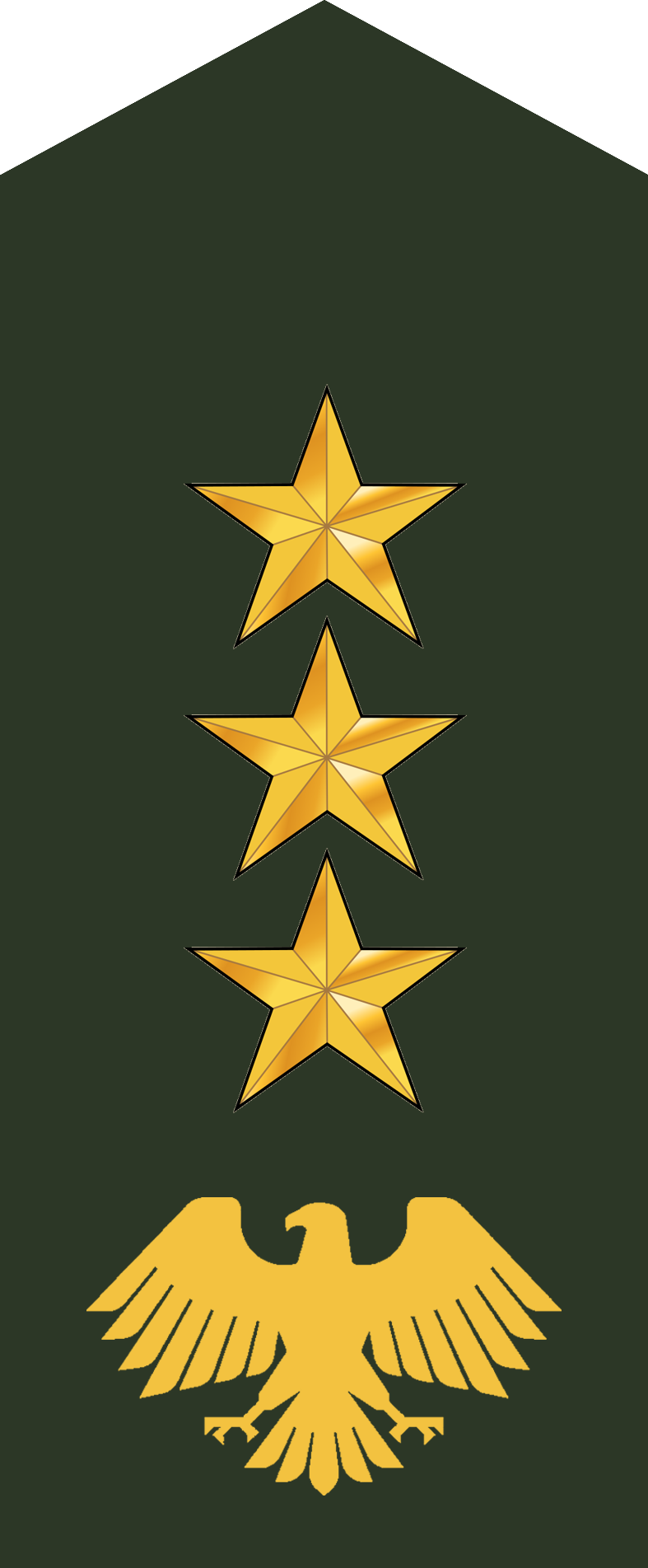
- Rank: Brigadier General
- Conflicts: Syrian civil war; 2024 Syrian opposition offensives; Battle of Aleppo (2024)

Ahmed Haitham al-Dalati (Arabic: أحمد هيثم الدالاتي) is a Syrian politician, security official, and former military commander, having previously served as deputy commander-in-chief of Ahrar al-Sham. He was appointed governor of Quneitra Governorate by Syria's caretaker government on 8 March 2025, following the fall of the Assad regime, and served as commander of Internal Security in Suwayda Governorate from 25 May 2025 to 2 September 2025. He has served in the same role in Rif Dimashq since 2 September.

== Early life and education ==
Al-Dalati was born in 1985 in Kfeir al-Zayt in the Wadi Barada region of Rif Dimashq. He completed elementary school in his hometown, then attended middle and high school in Damascus, and earned a bachelor's degree in engineering from the Technical Institute of Computer Science in Damascus.

== Activity during the civil war ==
Al-Dalati joined the Syrian opposition in 2011 upon the outbreak of the Syrian civil war. He joined Jaysh al-Islam early on in the war, but after moving to northern Syria in 2015, he joined Ahrar al-Sham, contributing to establishing Ahrar al-Sham in southern governorates such as Damascus and its countryside. In early 2016, he was appointed as the Southern Region Command Officer of Ahrar al-Sham, and later was appointed to the group's Shura Council.

He was appointed deputy commander-in-chief of Ahrar al-Sham on 16 June 2021, after Amer al-Sheikh had been appointed leader a year prior to end a leadership dispute between Jaber Ali Pasha and Hassan Soufan.

According to Al-Araby Al-Jadeed, he was "one of the most influential figures" in managing and planning military and political operations. In late 2024, he played a "key role" during the Deterrence of Aggression offensive, such as participating in the Battle of Aleppo.

== Post-Assad era ==
Following the fall of the Assad regime, he was appointed governor of Quneitra on 8 March 2025, having previously served as deputy governor of Rif Dimashq Governorate to Amer al-Sheikh.

On 25 May 2025, he was appointed Internal Security commander of As-Suwayda Governorate, as part of a broader organizational restructuring by the Syrian Ministry of Interior.

Reuters reported on 27 May that, according to Syrian and Western sources, al-Dalati has led diplomatic contacts with Israel, though he officially denied this to Syrian state news network Alikhbaria.

On 2 September 2025, he was appointed commander of Internal Security in Rif Dimashq Governorate, succeeding Hussam al-Tahhan.
