= Al-Zabadani District =

al-Zabadani District منطقة الزبداني
- District
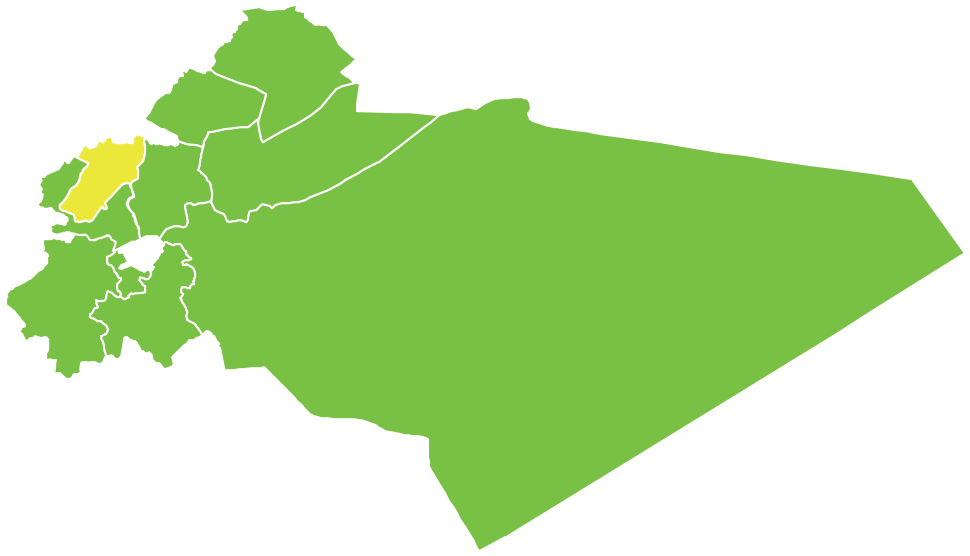
- Map of al-Zabadani District within Rif Dimashq Governorate
- Coordinates (al-Zabadani): 33.72°N 36.08°E
- Country: Syria
- Governorate: Rif Dimashq
- Seat: al-Zabadani
- Subdistricts: 3 nawāḥī

Area
  - Total: 393.42 km^{2} (151.90 sq mi)

Population (2004)
  - Total: 63,780
  - Density: 162.1/km^{2} (419.9/sq mi)
- Geocode: SY0307

al-Zabadani District (Arabic: منطقة الزبداني, romanized: manṭiqat al-Zabadani) is a district of the Rif Dimashq Governorate in southern Syria. Administrative centre is the city of al-Zabadani. At the 2004 census, the district had a population of 63,780.

Until February 2009, the sub-districts of Ayn al-Fijah and al-Dimas were part of Al-Zabadani District before being incorporated to form the newly established Qudsaya District.

The town-resort of Bloudan in the al-Zabadani district is a favourite tourist destination for locals and foreigners.

== Sub-districts ==
The district of al-Zabadani is divided into three sub-districts or nawāḥī (population as of 2004):

Subdistricts of al-Zabadani District
Code	Name	Area	Population
SY030700	al-Zabadani Subdistrict	178.67 km^{2}	40,613
SY030701	Madaya Subdistrict	93.37 km^{2}	13,692
SY030702	Serghaya Subdistrict	121.37 km^{2}	9,475

== Settlements ==
According to the Central Bureau of Statistics (CBS), the following villages, towns and cities make up the district of al-Zabadani:

English Name	Arabic Name	Population	Subdistrict
al-Zabadani	الزبداني	26,285	al-Zabadani
Madaya	مضايا	9,371	Madaya
Serghaya	سرغايا	7,501	Serghaya
al-Rawdah (al-Batrounah)	(الروضة (البطرونة	4,536	al-Zabadani
Souq Wadi Barada	سوق وادي بردى	3,678	al-Zabadani
Bloudan	بلودان	3,101	al-Zabadani
Hurayra	هريرة	2,455	Madaya
Ain Hawr	عين حور	1,974	Serghaya
Baqin	بقين	1,866	Madaya
Kafr al-Awamid	كفر العواميد	1,588	al-Zabadani
Barheliya	برهليا	821	al-Zabadani
Hosh Bajed	حوش بجد	604	al-Zabadani
