= Hurairah =

Hurairah may refer to:

- Abu Hurairah - one of the companions of Muhammad
- Tell Abu Hureyra - an archaeological site in the Euphrates valley
- Hurayra - a Syrian village
