= Bukin =

Bukin (Russian: Букин) is a Russian masculine surname, its feminine counterpart is Bukina. It may refer to

- Andrei Bukin (born 1957), Russian ice dancer
- Ekaterina Bukina (born 1987), Russian wrestler
- Ivan Bukin (born 1993), Russian ice dancer, son of Andrei
- Tanatkan Bukin (born 1967), Russian Paralympic sitting volleyball player

== See also ==
- Bukin (coin), Japanese coin in Edo period feudal Japan
- Mladenovo, Serbian village also known as Bukin
- Baqin, old name for this Syrian village
