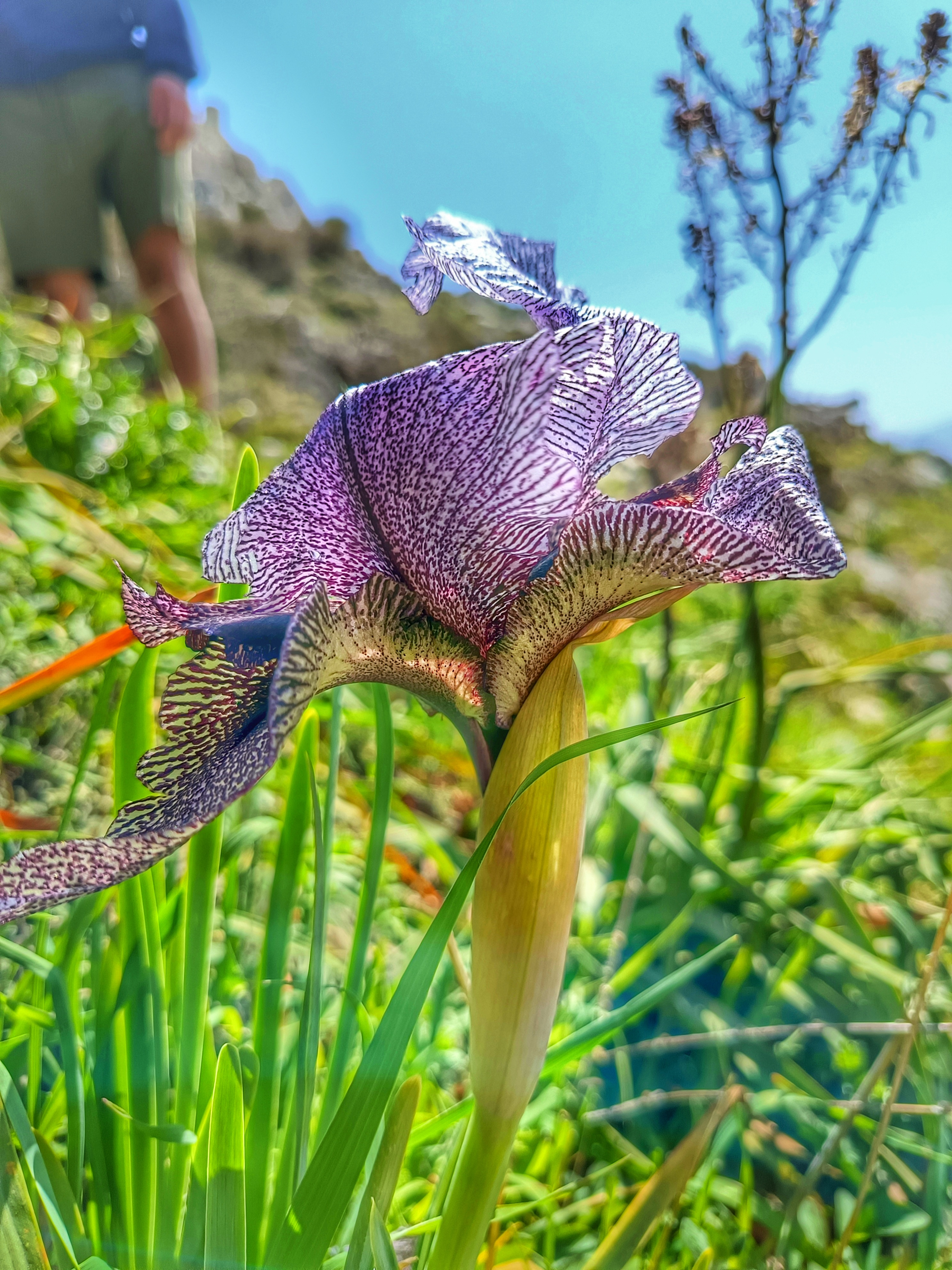

Conservation status
- Endangered (IUCN 3.1)

Scientific classification
- Kingdom: Plantae
- Clade: Embryophytes
- Clade: Tracheophytes
- Clade: Spermatophytes
- Clade: Angiosperms
- Clade: Monocots
- Order: Asparagales
- Family: Iridaceae
- Genus: Iris
- Species: I. westii

Binomial name
- Iris westii Dinsm.

Synonyms
- Iris sofarana f. westii (Dinsm.) Mouterde; Iris susiana f. westii (Dinsm.) Sealy

= Iris westii =

Species of plant

Iris westii is a species in the genus Iris, it is also in the subgenus of Iris and in the Oncocyclus section. It is from the mountain sides of Lebanon. It has curved grey-green leaves, a stem carrying one flower in shades of lilac, white or beige with spotting or veins in a darker shade or violet. The lower petals have deep velvety chocolate or deep violet-black signal patch and a purple beard. It rare and threatened due to habitat destruction, from military actions, overgrazing by goats and other factors.

== Description ==
Iris westii has short and compact rhizomes, which are about 3 cm long. Underneath the rhizome are very long secondary roots.

It has up to 6, grey-green leaves, which are lanciform (shaped like a lance) or falcate, or curved, and cutlass-shaped. They are around 5–12 mm wide, 6–8 in (152–203 mm) long, and will normally die back after the plant has flowered, then they re-grow in the following spring.

It has a cylindrical stem, that can grow up to 30 cm (12 in) long. The stem also has spathes which slightly inflated at the base and are larger than the perianth.

The solitary flower, blooms in mid-season, during April, or May. The large flower resembles the bloom of Iris hermona.

Like other irises, it has 2 pairs of petals, 3 large sepals (outer petals), known as the 'falls' and 3 inner, smaller petals (or tepals), known as the 'standards'. The standards are between 7–8 cm (3–3 in) long, in shades of pale lilac, or beige, or white. They are veined and dotted with violet, or dark lilac blue. The oval shaped falls, are 7 cm (3 in) long and 4 cm (2 in) wide. They come in shades of pale tan, pale yellow, or creamy-white. They are also dotted or blotched and veined in purple-violet, purplish, or chocolate shades. In the centre of the falls, is a signal patch which comes in shades of deep velvety chocolate, or deep violet-black. Also it has row of tiny hairs called the 'beard', which is sparse and purple.

It also has style branches which are 2–3 cm long and have toothed edges.

=== Biochemistry ===
As most irises are diploid, having two sets of chromosomes. This can be used to identify hybrids and classification of groupings. It has a chromosome count of 2n=20.

== Taxonomy ==
It is written in Arabic script as سوسن وست

There is no published reasons to the usage of the Latin specific epithet westii, but William Armstrong West (1894–1980), professor of chemistry in the American University of Beirus accompanied Dinsmore on several of his collecting expeditions, and had a special interest in Oncocylus Irises.

It was found on Mount Lebanon (or as it was previously known as Libanus), and then was published and described by John E. Dinsmore in 1933 in Flora of Syria, Palestine & Sinai; (edited by G. E. Post and printed in Beirut) Edition 2 on page 596.

It was the re-published in Amer. Col. 1933 and in 1939. Although it was listed in the 1939 checklist as a form of Iris susiana (anther Oncocyclus iris) but it was then restored back to species status in Brian Mathew's book 'The Iris') in 1981.

Iris westii is an accepted name by the RHS and it was verified by United States Department of Agriculture and the Agricultural Research Service on 4 April 2003.

== Distribution and habitat ==
It is native to temperate Asia.

=== Range ===
It is endemic to Lebanon.

It is also found on Mount Hermon, near the town of Jezzine, and on the southern part of the Lebanon Mountains ridge.

One old source from 1934 mistakenly notes that it is native to Palestine.

=== Habitat ===
It grows on the rocky, limestone mountain slopes within open sub-alpine scrubland.

The plants can be found at an altitudes of between 750–1,200 m (2,460–3,940 ft) above sea level, which is quite rare for an Oncocyclus species iris.

== Conservation ==
Total population size of the iris plants was estimated to be less than 500 mature individuals. As the populations found in the Lebanon mountains and in Jezzine area are very small. Mt. Hermon had a relatively large population of 30 to 60 individual plants.

Therefore, it was listed as critically endangered in 2008.

Then similarly to Iris antilibanotica and Iris damascena, it was declared extinct in 2009 in Lebanon, by Saad et al. (2009). Although the IUCN Redlist has reported that the iris has 4 declining populations in 2016 within the southern part of the Lebanon Mountains ridge and from near Jezzine (Niha).

Both of these areas are still littered with landmines, a leftover after the recent war. See Syrian Civil War spillover in Lebanon between 2011 and 2017. Making the locations both not very accessible.

The plant is still threatened by continuing military activities in the area, overgrazing by goats, crop growing and aquaculture. Also the effects from climate change, which is reducing snow-cover and water availability. These various factors are all thought to be contributing to habitat degradation in Lebanon.

== Cultivation ==
I. westii is not an easy plant to grow, so not suitable for novice growers. It is winter hardy, but does need a well drained soil and plenty of moisture during the growing months, in the spring. After it has flowered, it needs a period of dryness during the summer. Balancing the various needs of the plant is crucial for the plant to grow.

== Toxicity ==
Like many other irises, most parts of the plant are poisonous (rhizome and leaves), if mistakenly ingested can cause stomach pains and vomiting. Also handling the plant may cause a skin irritation or an allergic reaction.

== Other sources ==
- Saad L., Khuri S. 2003. Hanging in there by a fall The Oncocyclus of Lebanon. BIS Yearbook. pp 50–53.
- Saad, L., Mahy, G. 2009. Molecular and morphological variation of rare endemic oncocyclus irises (Iridaceae) of Lebanon. Botanical Journal of the Linnean Society. 159: 123–135. doi: 10.1111/j.1095-8339.2008.00896.x
- Saad L., Talhouk S.N., Mahy G. 2009. Decline of endemic oncocyclus irises (iridaceae) of Lebanon: Survey and conservation needs. Oryx 43: 91–96.
- Georges Tohmé & Henriette Tohmé. 2002. A Thousand and One Flowers of Lebanon, Publications of the Lebanese University, Beirut, Republic of Lebanon.
- A Guide to Species Irises. Cambridge University Press. British Iris Society, Species Group.
- Paul Mouterde. 1984. Nouvelle flore du Liban et de la Syrie. Editions de l'Impr. catholique, Beyrouth, 3 tomes.
- Dykes W.R., 1913. The Genus Iris. Cambridge University Press.
