= Deir Qanun =

Deir Qanun دير قانون
- Village
- Location within Syria
- Coordinates: 33°36′18″N 36°8′8″E
- Country: Syria
- Governorate: Rif Dimashq Governorate
- District: Qudsaya District
- Nahiyah: Ain al-Fijah

Population (2004 census)
  - Total: 4,213
- Time zone: UTC+2 (EET)
  - Summer (DST): UTC+3 (EEST)
- Area code: 11

Deir Qanun also spelled Dayr Qanun (Arabic: دير قانون) is a village in southern Syria, administratively part of the Rif Dimashq Governorate, located northwest of Damascus in the Wadi Barada. Nearby localities include Ain al-Fijah, Deir Muqaran, al-Dimas, Jdeidat al-Wadi, Kfeir al-Zayt and Basimah. According to the Syria Central Bureau of Statistics, Deir Qanun had a population of 4,213 in the 2004 census.

== History ==
Deir Qanun was visited by Syrian geographer Yaqut al-Hamawi in the early 13th century, during Ayyubid rule. He noted that it was a village "in the neighborhood of Damascus."

In 1838, Eli Smith noted that Deir Qanun‘s population was Sunni Muslim.

Famous Figures

Ahmad Humam Haidar, former secretary of the Baath Arab Socialist Party (BASP) in Damascus Countryside Branch and a former member of the BASP’s Central Committee.

== Bibliography ==
- Le Strange, G. (1890). Palestine Under the Moslems: A Description of Syria and the Holy Land from A.D. 650 to 1500. London: Committee of the Palestine Exploration Fund. OCLC 1004386.
- Robinson, E.; Smith, E. (1841). Biblical Researches in Palestine, Mount Sinai and Arabia Petraea: A Journal of Travels in the year 1838. Vol. 3. Boston: Crocker & Brewster.
