= Hosh Bajed =

Hosh Bajed حوش بجد Hawsh Bajed
- Village
- Location in Syria
- Coordinates: 33°39′13″N 36°3′35″E
- Country: Syria
- Governorate: Rif Dimashq Governorate
- District: Al-Zabadani District
- Nahiyah: Al-Zabadani

Population (2004 census)
  - Total: 604
- Time zone: UTC+2 (EET)
  - Summer (DST): UTC+3 (EEST)

Hosh Bajed or Hawsh Bajed (Arabic: (تلال الأرز)حوش بجد) is a Syrian village in the Al-Zabadani District of the Rif Dimashq Governorate. According to the Syria Central Bureau of Statistics (CBS), Hosh Bajed had a population of 604 in the 2004 census.
