= Bloudan =

Village in Syria

Bloudan بلودان
- Village
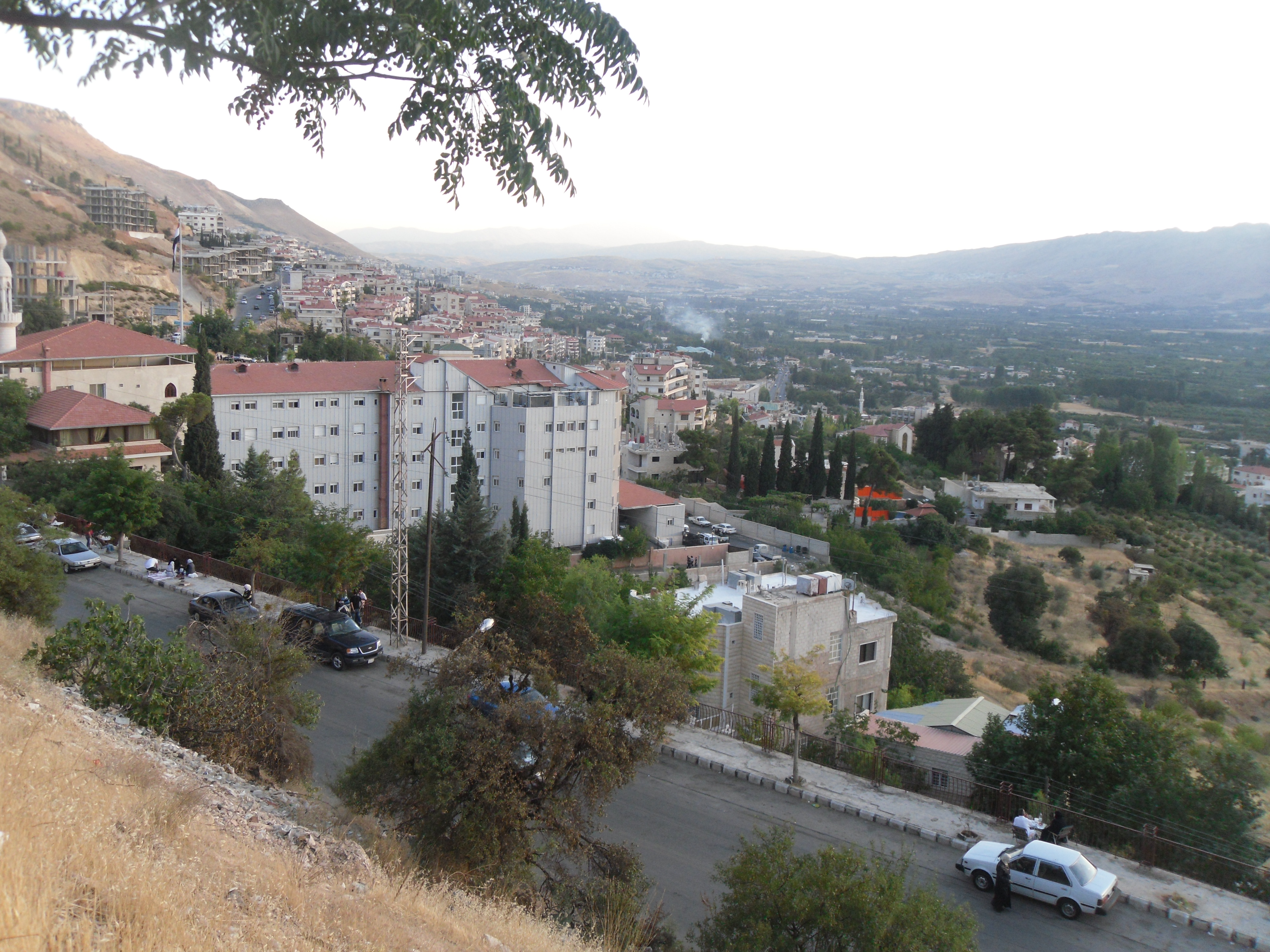
- Bloudan is located 51 kilometers north-west of Damascus

- Location in Syria
- Coordinates: 33°44′N 36°08′E
- Country: Syria
- Governorate: Rif Dimashq Governorate
- District: Al-Zabadani District
- Nahiyah: Al-Zabadani
- Elevation: 1,500 m (4,900 ft)

Population (2004)
  - Total: 3,101
- Time zone: UTC+2 (EET)
  - Summer (DST): UTC+3 (EEST)
- Area code: 13

Bloudan (Arabic: بلودان, romanized: Blūdān) is a Syrian village located 51 kilometers north-west of Damascus, in the Rif Dimashq Governorate; it has an altitude of about 1500 meters. In the 2004 census by the Central Bureau of Statistics it had a population of 3,101. The majority of the inhabitants are Greek Orthodox Christian, and a significant minority are Sunni Muslim and Protestant.

Bloudan is situated on top of a hill that overlooks the Al-Zabadani plain and is surrounded by mountain forests. Its moderate temperature and low humidity in summer attracts visitors from Damascus and throughout Syria; as a tourist destination, it is visited by thousands every year, mainly Arabs from Lebanon and the Arab States of the Arabic Gulf. In winter, Bloudan is usually snowy and draws skiers. Bloudan has restaurants and hotels, including the Great Bloudan Hotel.

== Etymology ==
The current name, Bloudan, is derived from the Aramaic name Bil-dan, which means the place of the god Bil or Ba'al. Bloudan is also called the land of almond, because its forests are dominated by almond trees.

J. E. Hanauer suggested that the name "Bloudan" may be related to the Greco-Roman deity Pluto, because Arabic-speakers typically do not use the letter 'p'. However, he also speculated that "Bludan" might come from the plural of "Blota" in the Maaloula dialect, which means ''district'.

== History ==
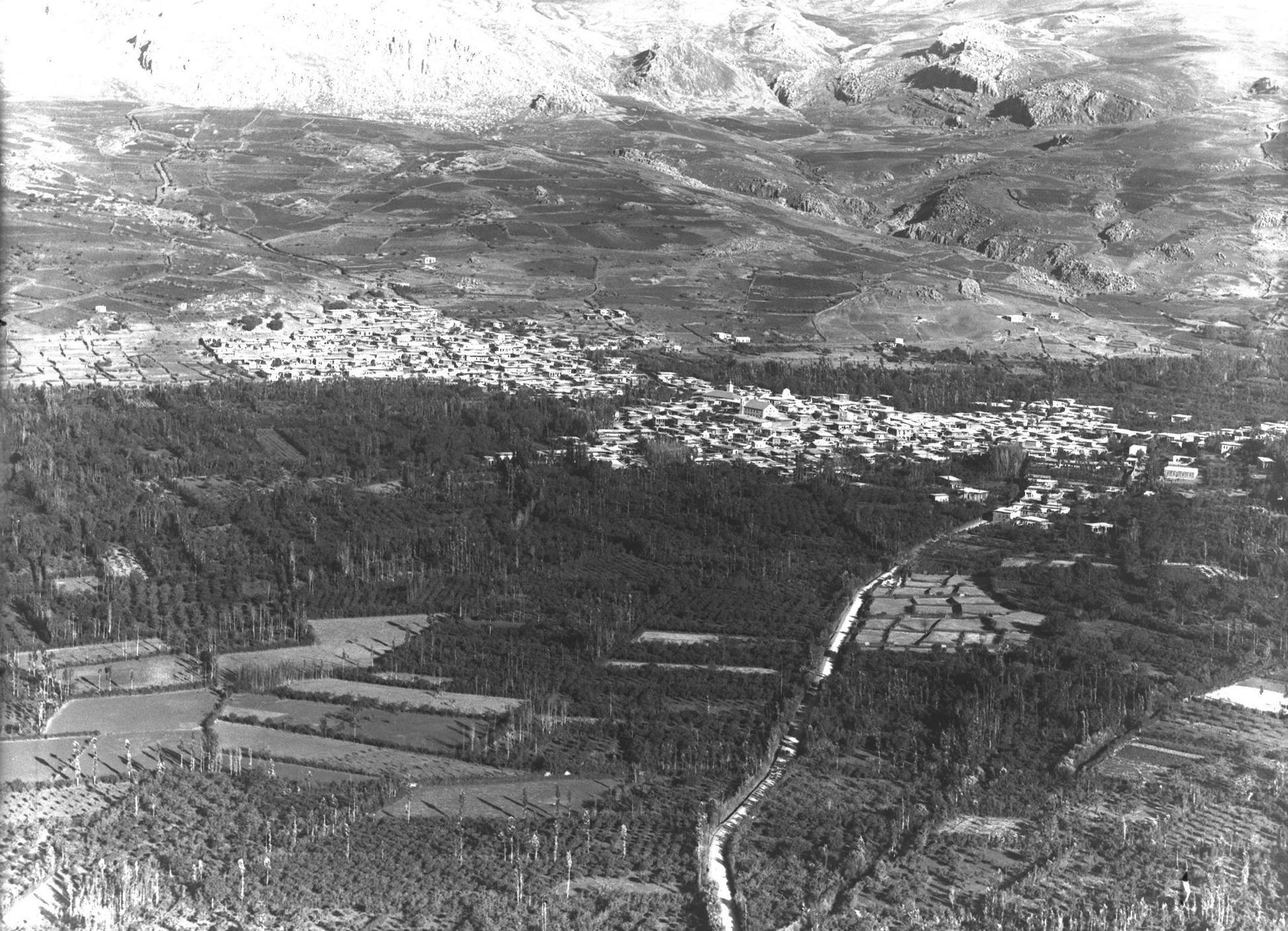
Aerial view of Bloudan and Al-Zabadani in 1933.

Bloudan is a very ancient village whose history goes back to the Roman era, as is evident by the paintings and carvings found in southern Bloudan. Remains of an ancient Greek Orthodox monastery and the St. George church are also found in the mountains of eastern Bloudan. The St. Elias valley is an ancient part of the village.

In 1838, Eli Smith noted that Bloudan's population was Antiochian Greek Christians and Sunni Muslims.

In 1909, J. E. Hanauer shared observations and stories from a visit in Bludan, noting the local customs, linguistic peculiarities, and the impact of religious and cultural traditions on the daily life and landscape. He recounted discovering a Byzantine convent's ruins near Bludan, called "Deir Mar Jirius", believed to have been destroyed in the thirteenth century AD, and shared a local legend about the sanctuary of "El 'Areija Om Esh-Sharif", or "the Little Lame Mother of Potsherds", where women break new jars as part of a vow fulfillment, a practice he speculated might stem from ancient fertility worship.

Modern Bloudan, constructed of rendered concrete, has largely replaced the Greek Orthodox village built in the 18th and 19th centuries.

== Culture ==
In 1909, Hanauer documented his visit to "El 'Areija Om Esh-Sharif", or "the Little Lame Mother of Potsherds", a maqam (sanctuary) located on a steep hillside about a mile south of Bloudan. The site, featuring a stone-terraced area with partially buried stone circle, is named after the scattered shards of new jars found there, under the shade of ancient oaks. Hanauer noted that the site serves as a place of worship where both Christian and Muslim women from surrounding villages break new jars to fulfill vows, as offerings of old jars are not accepted. He documented a tale of a jar that purportedly followed a woman home for not breaking it. Furthermore, Hanauer mentioned annual spring religious processions that include this site and suggested that the jar-breaking ritual could stem from ancient fertility worship practices, possibly honoring deities such as Mylitta or Astarte, with the shattered jars symbolizing related sacrifices.

== Climate ==
Bloudan has a relatively cool-summer Mediterranean type of climate. Being about 1000 metres higher than the city centre of Damascus means that Bloudan and other settlements in its vicinity are sought after by those who want to escape the arid and hot climate of the capital city. Summers in Bloudan are long, dry, and cool while the winter season is three months long with heavy rain and snow.

Climate data for Bloudan
Month	Jan	Feb	Mar	Apr	May	Jun	Jul	Aug	Sep	Oct	Nov	Dec	Year
Mean daily maximum °C (°F)	6.1 (43.0)	6.6 (43.9)	10.1 (50.2)	14.0 (57.2)	18.9 (66.0)	22.7 (72.9)	24.9 (76.8)	25.3 (77.5)	24.1 (75.4)	19.2 (66.6)	13.2 (55.8)	6.9 (44.4)	16.0 (60.8)
Daily mean °C (°F)	2.1 (35.8)	2.6 (36.7)	5.4 (41.7)	9.1 (48.4)	13.2 (55.8)	17.0 (62.6)	19.0 (66.2)	19.5 (67.1)	17.7 (63.9)	13.5 (56.3)	8.8 (47.8)	3.4 (38.1)	10.9 (51.7)
Mean daily minimum °C (°F)	−1.8 (28.8)	−1.4 (29.5)	0.8 (33.4)	4.3 (39.7)	7.5 (45.5)	11.4 (52.5)	13.1 (55.6)	13.7 (56.7)	11.4 (52.5)	7.9 (46.2)	4.4 (39.9)	0.0 (32.0)	5.9 (42.7)
Average precipitation mm (inches)	146 (5.7)	118 (4.6)	99 (3.9)	44 (1.7)	23 (0.9)	0 (0)	0 (0)	0 (0)	2 (0.1)	27 (1.1)	68 (2.7)	129 (5.1)	656 (25.8)
Source: climate-data.org

== Bibliography ==
- Robinson, E.; Smith, E. (1841). Biblical Researches in Palestine, Mount Sinai and Arabia Petraea: A Journal of Travels in the year 1838. Vol. 3. Boston: Crocker & Brewster.
