= Kfeir al-Zayt =

Kfeir Alzeit كفير الزيت
- Village
- Location within Syria
- Coordinates: 33°36′42″N 36°8′23″E
- Country: Syria
- Governorate: Rif Dimashq Governorate
- District: Qudsaya District
- Nahiyah: Ain al-Fijah

Population (2004 census)
  - Total: 4,170
- Time zone: UTC+2 (EET)
  - Summer (DST): UTC+3 (EEST)
- Area code: 11

Kfeir Alzeit (also spelled Kufayr al-Zayt) (Arabic: كفير الزيت) is a village in southern Syria, administratively part of the Rif Dimashq Governorate, located northwest of Damascus in the Wadi Barada. Nearby localities include Ain al-Fijah, Deir Qanun, al-Dimas, Jdeidat al-Wadi, Deir Muqaran and Basimah. According to the Syria Central Bureau of Statistics, Kfeir Alzeit had a population of 4,170 in the 2004 census.

== History ==
The first anti-government protest in Wadi Barada was in Kfeir Alzeit and took place on April 1, 2011 when people left the Mohammad Al-Amin Mosque after Friday prayers. A group of about 30 men gathered outside and started chanting slogans: “Allahu akbar,” “Freedom!” and “Daraa, we are with you until death!”. The protesters were mainly from outside the village, but some of them were villagers, and some were armed.

After the unrest, villagers with connections appealed to the presidential palace to send someone to negotiate with the protesters. A week later after morning prayer, a group from Kfeir Alzeit met with an official delegation headed by Issam Zahreddine, a brigadier general in the Syrian Republican Guard who went on to lead the assault on the district of Baba Amr in Homs in February 2012. The first thing the villagers demanded was to have the river restored and thereby get permanent access to clean drinking water. They also complained about the lack of public transportation and the land confiscations, and discussed a number of other local issues. The villagers did not call for the fall of the regime. Zahr al-Din conceded to all of the demands. According to one villager who attended the meeting, he said: “We are one family. This is a conspiracy against the homeland. We [the army and government] are here for the people and the people are ours.” There was no follow-up to the meeting, however, and in the weeks that followed, the protest movement in Kfeir Alzeit and across Wadi Barada gained force, despite the efforts of village elders to calm younger residents.

On May 24, 2013, with no apparent cause, the army shelled a funeral in Kfeir Alzeit with a 122-mm howitzer and killed a number of civilians. The regime bombed the same village on April 11, 2014, killing another two civilians and wounding a third, also for reasons unknown.
