= Deir Muqaran =

Deir Muqaran دير مقرن
- Village
- Location within Syria
- Coordinates: 33°36′58″N 36°9′25″E
- Country: Syria
- Governorate: Rif Dimashq Governorate
- District: Qudsaya District
- Nahiyah: Ain al-Fijah

Population (2004 census)
  - Total: 4,803
- Time zone: UTC+2 (EET)
  - Summer (DST): UTC+3 (EEST)
- Area code: 11

East Deir Muqaran, Syria

West Deir Muqaran, Syria

Deir Muqaran (Arabic: دير مقرن) is a village in southern Syria, administratively part of the Rif Dimashq Governorate, located northwest of Damascus in Wadi Barada. Nearby localities include Ain al-Fijah (which is immediately to the east), Kfeir al-Zayt (immediately to the west), Deir Qanun, al-Dimas, Jdeidat al-Wadi, and Basimah. According to the Syria Central Bureau of Statistics, Deir Muqaran had a population of 4,803 in the 2004 census. Its inhabitants are predominantly Sunni Muslims.

== History ==
In 1838, Eli Smith noted that Deir Muqaran's population was Sunni Muslim.

Minaret of Masjid Ali b. Abi Talib, Central Deir Muqaran, Syria

== Bibliography ==
- Robinson, E.; Smith, E. (1841). Biblical Researches in Palestine, Mount Sinai and Arabia Petraea: A Journal of Travels in the year 1838. Vol. 3. Boston: Crocker & Brewster.
