= Al-Rawdah (al-Batrounah) =

Al-Rawdah الروضة أو البطرونة al-Batrounah
- Village
- Location in Syria
- Coordinates: 33.653056°N 36.021667°E
- Country: Syria
- Governorate: Rif Dimashq Governorate
- District: Al-Zabadani District
- Nahiyah: Al-Zabadani

Population (2004 census)
  - Total: 4,536
- Time zone: UTC+2 (EET)
  - Summer (DST): UTC+3 (EEST)

Al-Rawdah or al-Batrounah (Arabic: الروضة أو البطرونة) is a Syrian village in the Al-Zabadani District of the Rif Dimashq Governorate. According to the Syria Central Bureau of Statistics (CBS), Al-Rawdah had a population of 4,536 in the 2004 census.

== History ==
In 1838, Eli Smith noted that Al-Batrounah population was Sunni Muslim.
