= Barheliya =

Barheliya برهليا
- Village
- Location in Syria
- Coordinates: 33°37′33″N 36°6′51″E
- Country: Syria
- Governorate: Rif Dimashq Governorate
- District: Al-Zabadani District
- Nahiyah: Al-Zabadani

Population (2004 census)
  - Total: 821
- Time zone: UTC+2 (EET)
  - Summer (DST): UTC+3 (EEST)

Barheliya (Arabic: برهليا) is a Syrian village in the Al-Zabadani District of the Rif Dimashq Governorate. According to the Syria Central Bureau of Statistics (CBS), Barheliya had a population of 821 in the 2004 census. Its inhabitants are predominantly Sunni Muslims.

== History ==
In 1838, Eli Smith noted that Barheliya's population was Sunni Muslim.

Barheliya is located near Abila Lysaniou. A mosaic floor was found in Barheliya, dates back to late Roman to early Byzantine era.

== Famous Figures ==
Muhammad Tammam Diab, a contractor with close ties to General Jamil Hassan, Former Director of the Air Force Intelligence Directorate of Syria.

== Bibliography ==
- Robinson, E.; Smith, E. (1841). Biblical Researches in Palestine, Mount Sinai and Arabia Petraea: A Journal of Travels in the year 1838. Vol. 3. Boston: Crocker & Brewster.
