= Al-Husseiniyah =

Al-Huseineah الحسينية الحسينية وادي بردى
- Village
- Location in Syria
- Coordinates: 33°36′34.6″N 36°07′16.9″E
- Country: Syria
- Governorate: Rif Dimashq Governorate
- District: Qudsaya District
- Nahiyah: Qudsaya

Population (2004 census)
  - Total: 1,563
- Time zone: UTC+2 (EET)
  - Summer (DST): UTC+3 (EEST)

Al-Huseineah (Arabic: الحسينية) is a Syrian village in the Qudsaya District of Wadi Barada. According to the Syria Central Bureau of Statistics (CBS), Alhuseineah huseineah had a population of 2,563 in the 2014 census. Its residents are predominantly Sunni Muslims.

== History ==
In 1838, Eli Smith noted that Al-Husseiniyah‘s population was Sunni Muslim.

== Bibliography ==
- Robinson, E.; Smith, E. (1841). Biblical Researches in Palestine, Mount Sinai and Arabia Petraea: A Journal of Travels in the year 1838. Vol. 3. Boston: Crocker & Brewster.
