= Forestry in Syria =

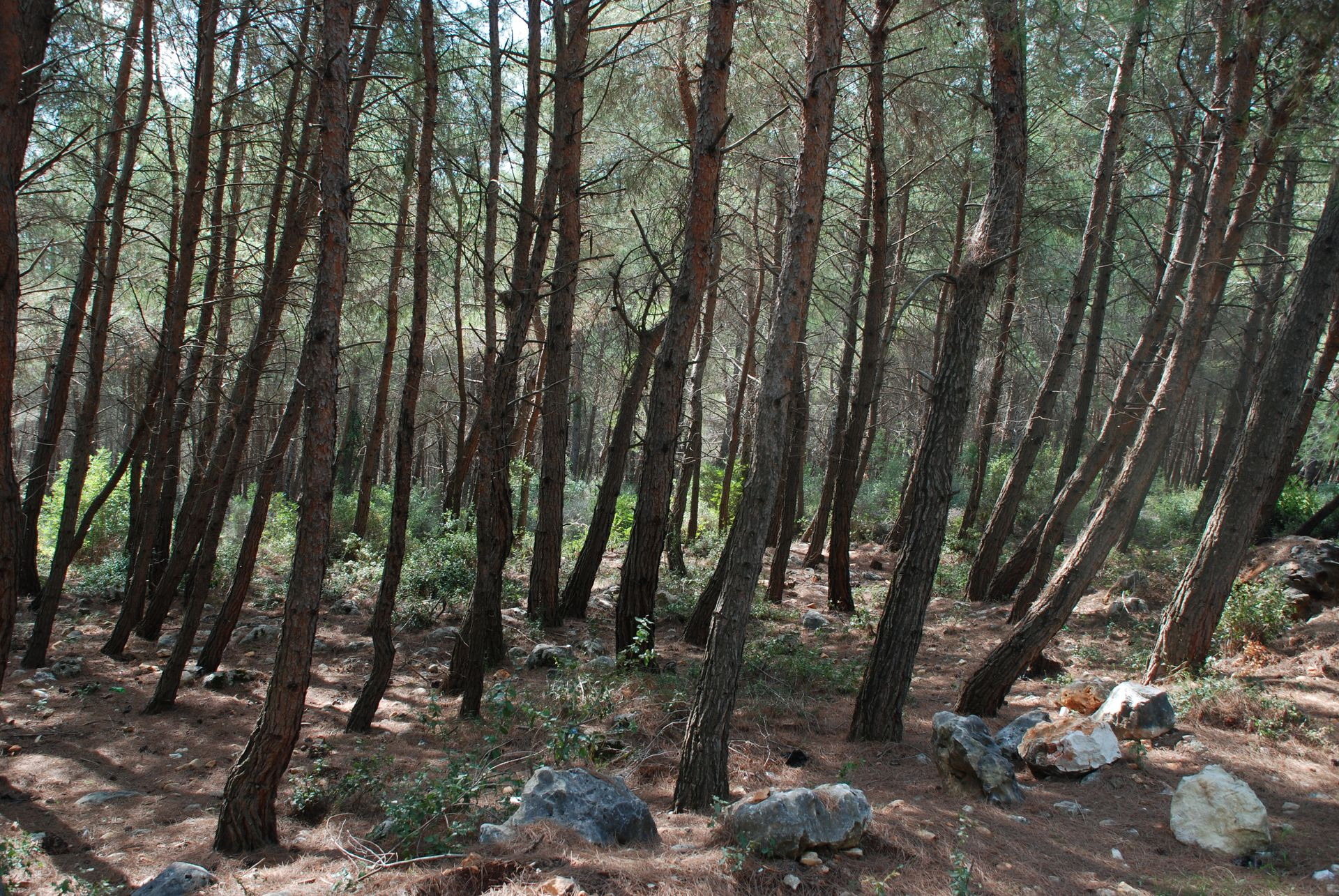
Pinus brutia woodland in the al-Ansariyah mountains

Forest resources in Syria are in need of study and conservation. Syria is an important centre of biological diversity containing 3077 species of plants, most of which are endemic to the Mediterranean or Iran-Turanian regions. The wooded area of the country is variously reported as approximately 190,000 hectares (1.0 per cent) or 450,000 hectares (2.4 per cent).

The principal woodland trees are Pinus brutia, the Turkish pine; Abies cilicica, the Cilician fir; Cedrus libani, the cedar of Lebanon; Cupressus sempervirens, the Mediterranean cypress; Pinus halepensis, the Aleppo pine; Quercus coccifera, the kermes oak; Quercus calliprinos, the Palestine oak; Quercus cerris sp. pseudocerris, the Turkey oak; Quercus infectoria; and Castanea sativa, the common chestnut.

== Risks due to natural disasters, unexploded ordnance, arson, & anthropogenic climate change ==
Forests and forest resources in Syria are at grave risk due to forest fires and globally occurring manmade climate change. A large-scale forest fire in Latakia in 2025 has destroyed numerous forested groves which span the hilly terrain of coastal Syria & neighbouring Jordan, Lebanon and also Turkey. Such large-scale wildfires as witnessed in Latakia and neighbouring Hatay. Firefighting crews, volunteers and The Syrian Civil Defence Forces, the Ministry of Emergency and Disaster Management. The government has also reported difficulty in battling these wildfires due to the noted occurrence of unexploded ordnance in some of the areas affected.

It has been found that from 2001 to 2024, Syria has lost approximately 18.00 kha of tree cover due to forest fires and 12.5 kha from all other types of losses with 2012 being the most devastating period where Syria lost over 3.92 kha of forest cover to fires i.e. 73% of all forest cover in that year. With Al Faralaq forest witnessing massive degradation due to forest fires.

Such events will aggravate the Syrian economy as it is still grappling with a drought and severe depletion of fresh water hydrological resources due to non-maintenance and next to no upkeep of hydrological infrastructure. Over the past years, an unprecedented fuel crisis in regime-held parts of Syria has driven increased logging. As people increasingly rely on firewood, demand increases and its price goes up. Farmers, who cannot care for their trees properly due to water shortages and the high cost of fertilizers and pesticides, face difficult choices. Most land irrigation in Syria and river water management are largely unsustainable hence droughts are getting more frequent with longer duration. This is further exacerbated by arson allegedly committed by former Assad remnants.

A report from June 2025, showed that since the Israeli invasion of Syria in 2024, the Israelis have deforested large portions of the Quneitra governorate. Hundreds of acres of trees have been cut down by Israel including the Jabaatha Nature Reserve and Kudna forest have been destroyed. The deforestation threatens wildlife and biodiversity in the region. Post-war effective forest management will be vital to ensure the sustainable use and recovery of forest resources, supporting both ecological restoration and economic stability for the rural communities.

Through studies conducted by using remote sensing and machine alogrithms with the aid of LANDSAT and PALSAR imagery researchers from CREAF, Spain have estimated that 19.3% of Syria's forests have been wiped out since the outbreak of the Syrian civil war in 2011 deforesting around 63,000 hectares of forested/wooded and agro-forestry/commercial forest produce plantations. With regions like Northern Daraa and Idlib being where studies have been conducted.

== See also ==
- Ajloun Forest Reserve (Jordan, near Syria)
- Cedars of God (Lebanon)
- Dibeen Forest Reserve (Jordan, near Syria)
