= Basimah =

Basimah بسيمة
- Village
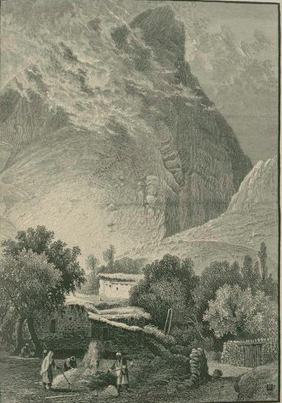
- Basimah, in the 1880s, from Picturesque Palestine, Sinai, and Egypt, vol 2, p. 199

- Location within Syria
- Coordinates: 33°36′17″N 36°11′41″E
- Country: Syria
- Governorate: Rif Dimashq Governorate
- District: Qudsaya District
- Nahiyah: Qudsaya

Population (2004 census)
  - Total: 2,812
- Time zone: UTC+2 (EET)
  - Summer (DST): UTC+3 (EEST)
- Area code: 11

Basimah (Arabic: بسيمة) is a village in southern Syria, administratively part of the Rif Dimashq Governorate, located northwest of Damascus in the Wadi Barada. Nearby localities include Ain al-Fijah, Deir Qanun, al-Dimas, Jdeidat al-Wadi, Deir Muqaran and Kfeir al-Zayt. According to the Syria Central Bureau of Statistics, Basimah had a population of 2,812 in the 2004 census. Its inhabitants are predominantly Sunni Muslims.

== History ==
In 1838, Eli Smith noted that Basimah‘s population was Sunni Muslim.

== Bibliography ==
- Robinson, E.; Smith, E. (1841). Biblical Researches in Palestine, Mount Sinai and Arabia Petraea: A Journal of Travels in the year 1838. Vol. 3. Boston: Crocker & Brewster.
