= Iris damascena =

Conservation status
- Critically Endangered (IUCN 3.1)

Scientific classification
- Kingdom: Plantae
- Clade: Embryophytes
- Clade: Tracheophytes
- Clade: Spermatophytes
- Clade: Angiosperms
- Clade: Monocots
- Order: Asparagales
- Family: Iridaceae
- Genus: Iris
- Subgenus: Iris subg. Iris
- Section: Iris sect. Oncocyclus
- Species: I. damascena

Binomial name
- Iris damascena Mouterde

Species of plant

Iris damascena is a species of plant in the genus Iris. It is a rhizomatous perennial endemic to Mount Qasioun in Syria. It has thin, sickle-shaped, grey-green leaves and medium-sized stem that holds 1-2 large flowers between March and April. Inflorescences are white or grey-white with purple-brown spotting or veining and a small blackish or dark purple signal patch with a sparse, purple or dark purple beard. It is rarely cultivated as an ornamental plant in temperate regions, as it needs very dry conditions during the summer. The species is classified as critically endangered by the IUCN.

== Description ==
The species is very similar in form to Iris sofarana, another Oncocyclus iris, from Syria and Lebanon. It has a short and compact brown rhizome, thick secondary roots and fine root hairs. Above the rhizome, there are 5-8 curved or falcate leaves of green or grey-green color. The narrow leaves, Leaves can grow up to 27–35 cm (11–14 in) long and up to 1 cm wide. They fade in winter and reappear in spring. It has a slender stem or peduncle, that can grow 15–30 cm (6–12 in) tall. The stem has 1 or 2 spathes (leaf of the flower bud), which are inflated, slightly pale violet-purple tinged and up to 10 cm (4 in) long. It holds one terminal (top of stem) flower, blooming between March, and April. The large flowers are between 9–16 cm (4–6 in) in diameter. They are bi-coloured, and have a creamy white, grey-white, or white ground, which is covered in brown-purple, or purple, veining, or spotting. The veining is similar to the veining on the flowers of I. sofarana. Like other irises, it has 2 pairs of petals, 3 large sepals (outer petals), known as the 'falls' and 3 inner, smaller petals (or tepals), known as the 'standards'. The falls are obovate to elliptic shaped, and up to 8 cm (3 in) long and 5 cm wide. They are more marked than the standards, In the centre of the falls, it has a small elliptical signal patch, 1.5 cm long and 1 cm wide, which is dark purple, or blackish. Also, in the middle of the falls, is a sparse, row of short hairs called the 'beard', which is dark purple, or purple. The paler standards are oval and up to 9 cm (4 in) long and 6 cm wide. They have thinner, or finer veining and small dots than the falls. They have anthers about 2.5 cm long. After the iris has flowered, it produces a seed capsule that has not yet been described.

As most irises are diploid, having two sets of chromosomes, this can be used to identify hybrids and classification of groupings. A 1977 analysis of the genome of 47 species of Oncocyclus irises showed that the species has a chromosome count of 2n=20.

== Taxonomy ==
The Latin specific epithet damascena refers to coming from Damascus, Syria. In 1693, the name Iris damascena was used for a species of Polyanthus, This name was later ignored due to Linnaeus' genus re-classification in 1753.

On 23 March 1951, a specimen of the iris (now stored at the Herbarium Conservatoire et Jardin botaniques de la Ville de Genève in Switzerland) was collected from a mountain in Syria. In 1957, the species and several other iris species from Syria were described by Werckmeister. The species was first formally described by Paul Mouterde in 'Nouv. Fl. Liban & Syrie' Vol.i n page 318 in 1966.

== Distribution and habitat ==
The species is known only from the eastern slopes of Mount Qasioun north of Damascus, part of the Anti-Lebanon mountain range. It grows on calcareous soils in association with low alpine vegetation and grasses, at an altitude of 1,200 m (3,900 ft) above sea level.

== Conservation ==
When first described by Mouterde in 1966, the species was assessed as "at risk" due to human collection of the rhizomes and the selling of the flowers in the roadside trade. The species was reported by Chaudhary in 1975 to be in danger of extinction, and although it was declared 'extinct' by some sources in 2013, as of 2016 it is assessed as Critically endangered by the IUCN. An estimated 100 clumps of plants currently remain. A field study in 2011 declared the species to be highly endangered. The Syrian government has not yet given the species any protected status.

The remaining population may benefit from the fact that part of its habitat is in a military area near the 'Qassioun Republican Guards Military Base' and other military facilities, which stops civilians accessing the area. The base and steepness of the habitat also stops construction or development.

== Cultivation ==
The species is very rare in cultivation due to being highly endangered. If grown, it prefers to grow in a sunny, well drained, rocky habitat. In northern Europe or the US, it needs to be planted under glass within a greenhouse or glasshouse, in an alkaline soil (with limestone chippings). It should be planted in March, then dug up in September or October and stored in wood shavings. The plants can be harmed by aphids.

=== Hybrids and Cultivars ===
I. damascena has two known cultivars: 'Qassioumensis' and 'Magnifica'. The latter, also known as 'I. Damascena cv. Magnifica', is cream-colored with purple markings, dark purple signal and purple beard.

== Toxicity ==
Like many other irises, most parts of the plant are poisonous (rhizome and leaves), and if ingested can cause stomach pains and vomiting. Handling the plant may cause a skin irritation or an allergic reaction.
