= Souq Wadi Barada =

Village in Syria

Souq Wadi Barada سوق وادي بردى
- Village
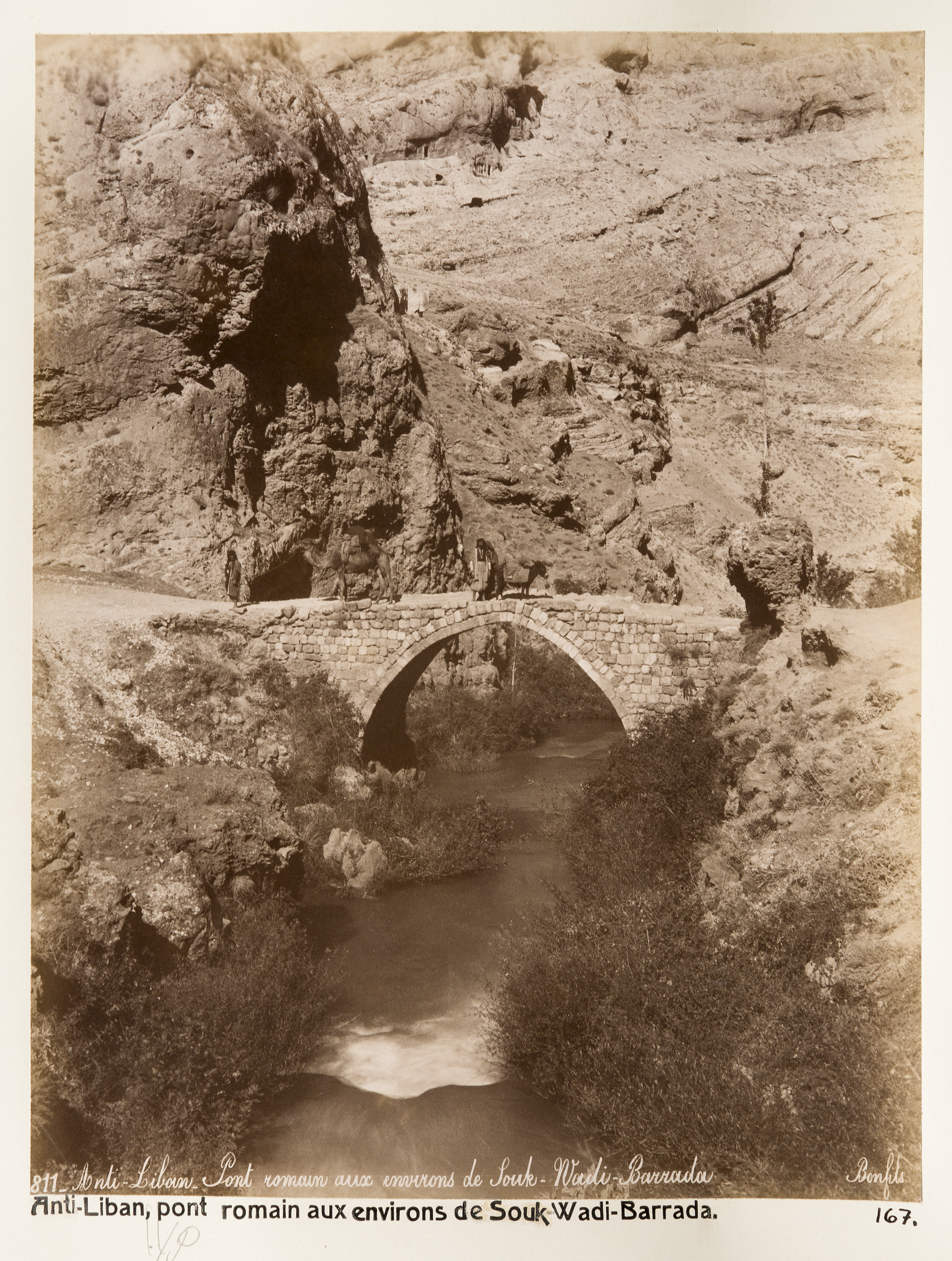
- Roman bridge by Souq Wadi Barada, by Felix Bonfils

- Location in Syria
- Coordinates: 33°37′27″N 36°6′20″E
- Country: Syria
- Governorate: Rif Dimashq Governorate
- District: Al-Zabadani District
- Nahiyah: Al-Zabadani

Population (2004 census)
  - Total: 3,678
- Time zone: UTC+2 (EET)
  - Summer (DST): UTC+3 (EEST)

Souq Wadi Barada (Arabic: سوق وادي بردى) also spelled Suq Wadi Barada is a Syrian village in the Al-Zabadani District of the Rif Dimashq Governorate. According to the Syria Central Bureau of Statistics (CBS), Souq Wadi Barada had a population of 3,678 in the 2004 census. Its inhabitants are predominantly Sunni Muslims.

== History ==
In 1838, Eli Smith noted that Souq Wadi Barada population was Sunni Muslim.

On 25 October 2013, two car bombs were detonated in the village in front of the Osama bin Zaid mosque. The SNHR was able to confirm the identities of at least 46 people killed and 420 wounded as a result of this incident. Many other victims could not be identified due to the condition of their bodies, with the overall death toll estimated to be between 150 and 225 people.

== See also ==
- Siege of Wadi Barada
- Abila Lysaniou

== Bibliography ==
- Robinson, E.; Smith, E. (1841). Biblical Researches in Palestine, Mount Sinai and Arabia Petraea: A Journal of Travels in the year 1838. Vol. 3. Boston: Crocker & Brewster.
