= Efra, Syria =

Village in Syria

Efra إفرة Evra
- Village
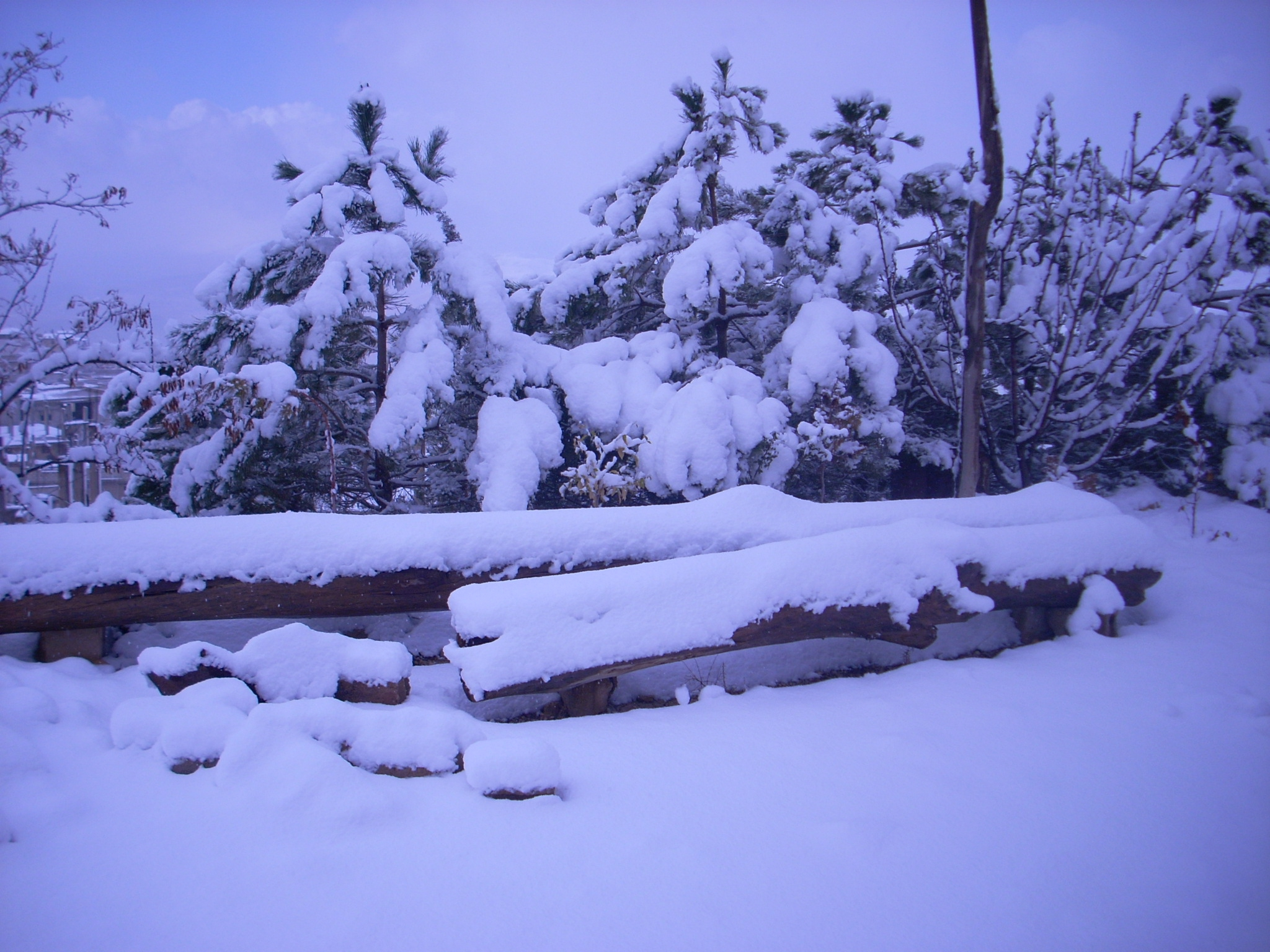
- Snow in Efra

- Location in Syria
- Coordinates: 33°39′22″N 36°11′19″E
- Country: Syria
- Governorate: Rif Dimashq
- District: Qudsaya
- Subdistrict: Ain al-Fijah
- Elevation: 1,600 m (5,200 ft)

Population (2004 census)
  - Total: 1,029
- Time zone: UTC+3 (EET)
  - Summer (DST): UTC+2 (EEST)

Efra, Evra or Afrah (Arabic: إفرة) is a small mountainous village in Qudsaya District, Syria. It is located 35 km from the city of Damascus and 10 km from Ain al-Fijah. Altitude is 1600 m. According to the Syria Central Bureau of Statistics, the village had a population of 1,029 in the 2004 census. Its inhabitants are predominantly Sunni Muslim. Efra experiences cold winters and mild summers. Inhabitants work mainly in agriculture. They produces various fruits like figs, apples, and cherries. The village used to be an ancient Roman summer resort due to its weather.

== History ==
In 1838, Eli Smith noted that Efra's population was Sunni Muslim.

== Bibliography ==
- Robinson, E.; Smith, E. (1841). Biblical Researches in Palestine, Mount Sinai and Arabia Petraea: A Journal of Travels in the year 1838. Vol. 3. Boston: Crocker & Brewster.
