= Al-Rawda, Hama =

Rawda الروضة
- Village
- Location in Syria
- Coordinates: 34.992364°N 36.598298°E
- Country: Syria
- Governorate: Hama
- District: Hama
- Subdistrict: Hirbnafsah

Population (2004)
  - Total: 479
- Time zone: UTC+3 (AST)
- City Qrya Pcode: N/A

Rawda (Arabic: الروضة) is a Syrian village located in the Hirbnafsah Subdistrict in Hama District. According to the Syria Central Bureau of Statistics (CBS), Rawda had a population of 479 in the 2004 census.
