= Al-Rawda, Tartus =

Al-Rawda الروضة Rauda
- Town
- Location in Syria
- Coordinates: 35°4′8″N 35°54′38″E
- Country: Syria
- Governorate: Tartus
- District: Baniyas
- Subdistrict: Rawda

Population (2004)
  - Total: 3,131

Al-Rawda (Arabic: الروضة; also spelled Rauda) is a small town in northwestern Syria, administratively part of the Tartus Governorate. It is situated along the Mediterranean coast and just west of the Syrian Coastal Mountains in between Tartus (to the south) and Baniyas (to the north). According to the Syria Central Bureau of Statistics (CBS), al-Rawda had a population of 3,131 in the 2004 census. It is the administrative center of the Rawda Subdistrict (nahiyah) which consisted of nine localities with a collective population of 11,688. Its inhabitants are predominantly Christians, from various denominations.
