= Kafr al-Awamid =

Kafr al-Awamid كفر العواميد Kafr al-Awameed
- Village
- Location in Syria
- Coordinates: 33°37′9″N 36°7′0″E
- Country: Syria
- Governorate: Rif Dimashq Governorate
- District: Al-Zabadani District
- Nahiyah: Al-Zabadani

Population (2004 census)
  - Total: 1,588
- Time zone: UTC+2 (EET)
  - Summer (DST): UTC+3 (EEST)

Kafr al-Awamid or Kafr al-Awameed (Arabic: كفر العواميد) is a Syrian village in the Al-Zabadani District of the Rif Dimashq Governorate. According to the Syria Central Bureau of Statistics (CBS), Kafr al-Awamid had a population of 1,588 in the 2004 census.
