= Anti-Lebanon Mountains =

Mountain range in The Golan Heights, Syria and Lebanon

- جبال لبنان الشرقية
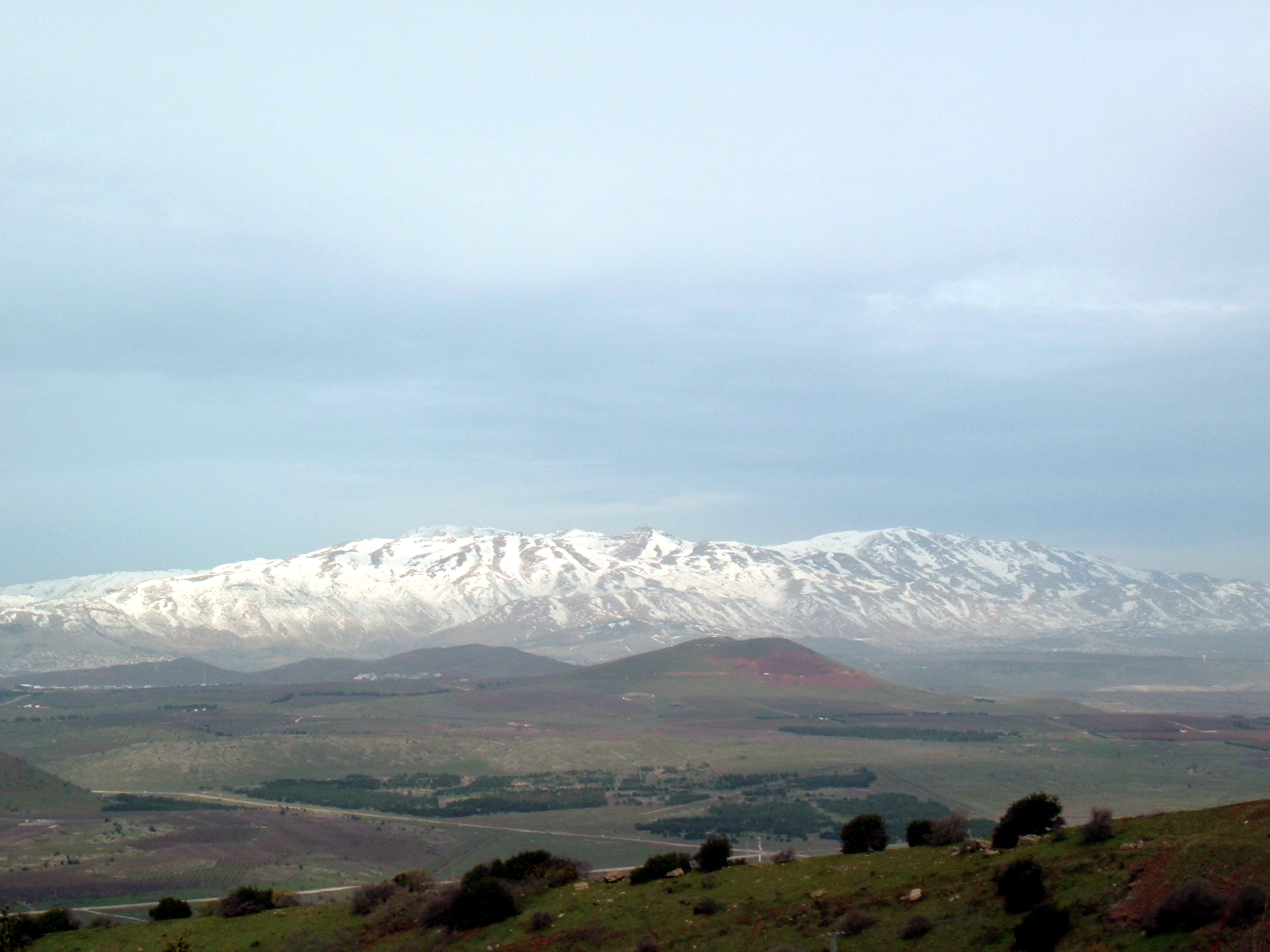
- Mount Hermon, the highest point in the Anti-Lebanon range, looking north from Mount Bental

Highest point
- Peak: Mount Hermon, Lebanon–Israel-Syria tripoint (disputed)
- Elevation: 2,814 m (9,232 ft)
- Coordinates: 34°N 36.5°E

Dimensions
- Length: 93 mi (150 km) Southwest–Northeast

Naming
- Etymology: Greek Antilibanus (opposite Mount Lebanon)
- Native name: جبال لبنان الشرقية
- English translation: Eastern Mountains of Lebanon

Geography
- Location: Syria, Lebanon
- Countries: Syria; Lebanon
- Borders on: Mount Lebanon (west), Beqaa Valley, Golan Heights (south), Eastern Plateau (east)

Geology
- Mountain type: Anticline
- Rock type(s): Limestone and chalk (Jurassic period)

The Anti-Lebanon Mountains (Arabic: جبال لبنان الشرقية, romanized: Jibāl Lubnān ash-Sharqiyyah, lit. 'eastern mountains of Lebanon') are a southwest–northeast-trending, c. 150 kilometres (93 miles) long mountain range that forms most of the border between Syria and Lebanon. The border is largely defined along the crest of the range.

== Etymology ==
Its Western name Anti-Lebanon comes from the Greek and Latin Antilibanus, derived from its position opposite (anti-) and parallel to the Mount Lebanon range (Libanus).

== Geology ==
The Anti-Lebanon range is approximately 150 kilometres (93 miles) in length. To the south, the range adjoins the lower-lying Golan Heights plateau, but includes the highest peaks, namely Mount Hermon (Jabal el-Shaykh, in Arabic), at 2,814 metres, and Ta'la't Musa, at 2,669 metres. These peaks, on the Lebanese-Syrian border, are snow-covered for much of the year.

The Anti-Lebanon Mountains are an anticline. Their predominant rocks are limestone and chalk from the Jurassic period.

== Geography ==
To the north, they extend to almost the latitude of the Syrian city of Homs. The mountains end in the south with Mount Hermon, which borders on the Golan Heights; the Golan Heights are a different geological and geomorphological entity, but geopolitically they are often regarded together with the southern slopes of Mount Hermon, both being Syrian territory occupied by Israel. To the west of the Anti-Lebanon lie valleys that separate it from Mount Lebanon in central Lebanon: Beqaa Valley in the north and the Hasbani River valley in the south. To the east, in Syria, lies the Eastern Plateau, location of the city of Damascus.

The mountains provide a rain shadow to the region on their east on their leeward side, such as the Syrian Desert.

An important smuggling route between Lebanon and Syria passes through the Anti-Lebanon mountains.

== Ecology ==
The area is known for its apricot and cherry trees as well as its stone quarries. In the mountains, amygdalus and pistachio bushes thrive. On the west side are small-scale deciduous forests and isolated dry coniferous forests with Cilician firs (Abies cilicica), Lebanon cedars (Cedrus libani) and Greek juniper (Juniperus excelsa). Subalpine and alpine plant communities occur over 2,500 metres. The grazing by sheep and goats has led to increased erosion of the remaining forests and substantial deterioration of soil and vegetation. The predominant form of economy is extensive nomadic grazing.

There are various endemic flora found and named after the region (having a specific epithet that means "of the Anti-Lebanon"). These include Euphorbia antilibanotica, Teucrium antilibanoticum, Valerianella antilibanotica, and Iris antilibanotica.

== See also ==
- Song of Songs 4
