= J. E. Hanauer =

Author, photographer and cleric (1850–1938)

James (John) Edward Hanauer (1850–1938) was an author, photographer, and Canon of St. George's Cathedral in Jerusalem.

== Biography ==
Hanauer was born to Bavarian Jewish and Swiss parents in Damascus and baptised in Jaffa (in then Ottoman Syria); he moved to Jerusalem at an early age. His father, Christian Wilhelm Hanauer, was born in Fellheim, Bavaria, in 1810, but came to Jerusalem and converted from Judaism to Christianity in September 1843 through the London Society. J. E. Hanauer later became head of the same institution through which his father converted.

Hanauer died in his home in Jerusalem on 15 June 1938. He was subsequently buried in Jerusalem's Protestant Cemetery, Mt. Zion Cemetery.

== Career ==
Hanauer was employed by Charles Warren's expedition to the Transjordan, as a translator and assistant photographer, the beginning of his interest in research on the antiquities and folklore of the region and leading to his involvement with the Palestine Exploration Fund. His papers and correspondence were published in the Quarterly Statement of that British society after 1881, which also issued his booklet Table of the Christian and Mohammedan Eras in 1904; he was supplied with high quality photographic equipment to supplement his productions. Some of his collection of photographs were reproduced in his 1910 work, Walks about Jerusalem; his brother and son were also active in this field. In 1907 his Folk-lore of the Holy Land: Moslem, Christian and Jewish was published in London.

== Bibliography ==
- Hanauer, J.E.; Masterman, E.W.G. (1901). "The ruin at Khurbet Beit Sawir". Quarterly Statement - Palestine Exploration Fund. 33 (3): 305–306. doi:10.1179/peq.1901.33.3.305.
- (pref. 1904): A table of the Christian and the Mohammedan eras from July 15th, A.D. 622, the date of the Hejira, to A.D. 1900
- (1904): Tales told in Palestine
- (1907): Folk-lore of the Holy Land. Moslem, Christian and Jewish
  - Alternative: Folk-lore of the Holy Land. Moslem, Christian and Jewish
- (1910): Walks about Jerusalem
