= Hurayra =

Village in Syria

Hurayra هريرة
- Village
- Location in Syria
- Coordinates: 33°39′57″N 36°7′5″E
- Country: Syria
- Governorate: Rif Dimashq Governorate
- District: Al-Zabadani District
- Nahiyah: Madaya

Population (2004 census)
  - Total: 2,455
- Time zone: UTC+2 (EET)
  - Summer (DST): UTC+3 (EEST)

Hurayra (Arabic: هريرة) or Harira is a Syrian village in the Al-Zabadani District of the Rif Dimashq Governorate. According to the Syria Central Bureau of Statistics (CBS), Hurayra had a population of 2,455 in the 2004 census. Its inhabitants are predominantly Sunni Muslims.

== History ==
In 1838, Eli Smith noted that Hurayra's population was Sunni Muslim.

== Bibliography ==
- Robinson, E.; Smith, E. (1841). Biblical Researches in Palestine, Mount Sinai and Arabia Petraea: A Journal of Travels in the year 1838. Vol. 3. Boston: Crocker & Brewster.
