= Al-Zabadani =

Al-Zabadani الزبداني Az-Zabadani
- City
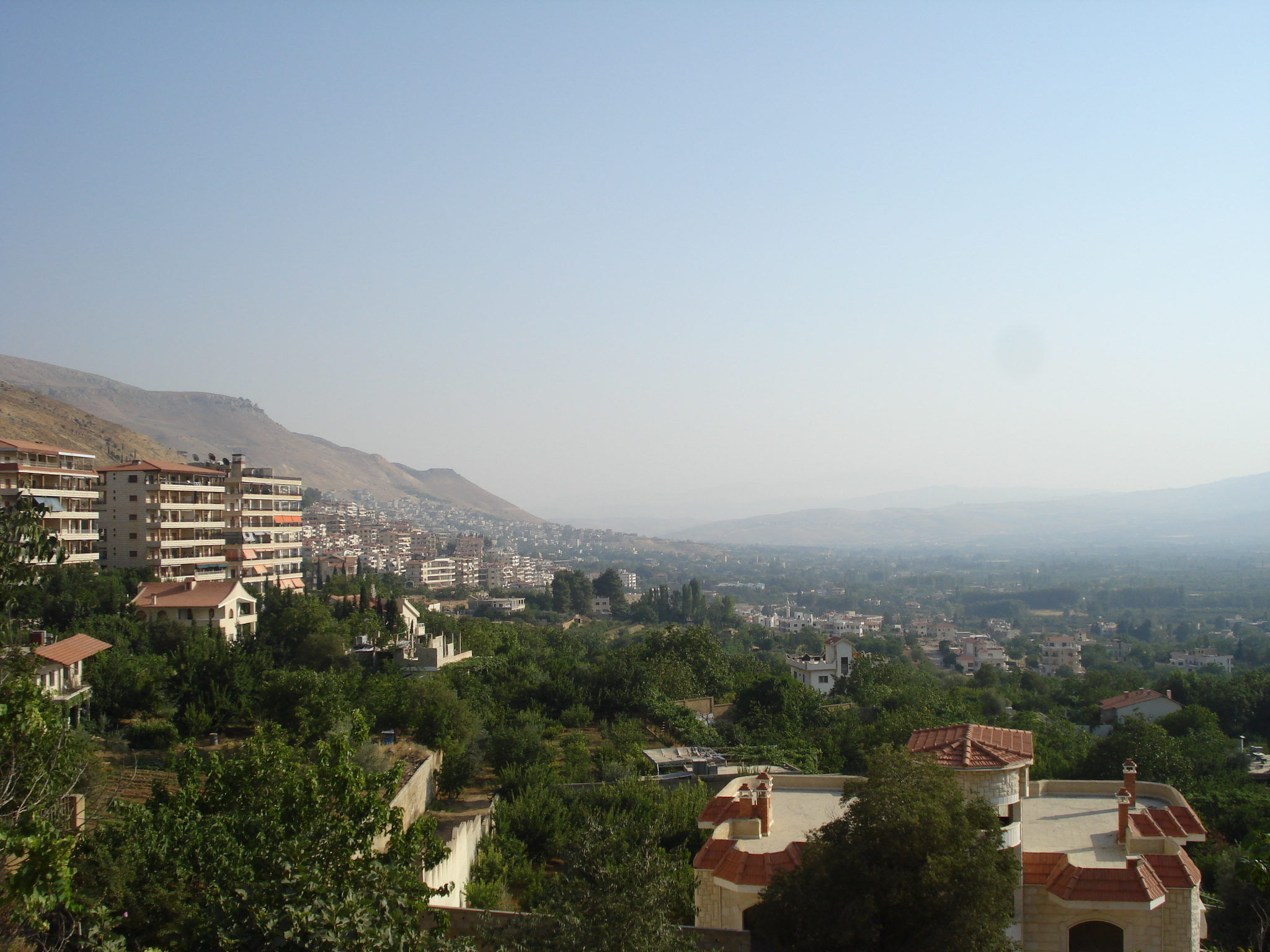
- Al-Zabadani

- Location in Syria
- Coordinates: 33°43′30″N 36°5′50″E
- Country: Syria
- Governorate: Rif Dimashq
- District: al-Zabadani
- Subdistrict: al-Zabadani
- Elevation: 1,100 m (3,600 ft)

Population (2004 census)
  - Total: 26,285
- Area code: 13

Al-Zabadani or Az-Zabadani (Arabic: الزبداني, romanized: az-Zabadānī) is a city in southwestern Syria in the Rif Dimashq Governorate, close to the border with Lebanon. It is located in the center of a green valley surrounded by high mountains at an elevation of around 1,100 m.

It is located to the right of the international road linking Damascus to Beirut, in the middle of the distance between Damascus and Baalbek, in a mountain valley in the Syrian mountain range, where it rises between 1,150 and 1,250 meters above sea level. Zabadani is located in the semi-arid to semi-humid region, with an average rainfall of 500 mm per year. It is bordered by two mountain ranges, Mount Senir to the west and Jabal Al Shaqif to the east, and in the middle of it is a green carpet that forms the Zabadani Plain.

According to the Syria Central Bureau of Statistics (CBS), in the 2004 census Al-Zabadani had a population of 26,285.

== Etymology ==
Zabadani's name likely derives from Aramaic.

== Overview ==
Compared to Damascus, the weather in Al-Zabadani tends to be milder in summer, about 5–8 degrees lower, but from December to the end of February it is colder with a lot of snow, and the temperature drops to −10 degrees.

The mild summer weather, along with scenic views, led the French colonial rulers to develop the city as a traditional summer resort and hill station, and has made the town a popular resort, both for tourists and for visitors from Syrian cities on the plains, especially nearby Damascus, and for tens of thousands of visitors from the Arabian peninsula. A more elevated region than Al-Zabadani is its neighbour Bloudan, also a resort for thousands of tourists. Bloudan is about 1,500 metres above sea level.

Al-Zabadani is predominantly Sunni, with a substantial Christian population, who have their own church and monastery. Before the Syrian Civil War, Al-Zabadani was rapidly growing and was well connected to Damascus. The war led to substantial destruction and damage of infrastructure and property. As a result, town's population has seen no substantial growth in the past two decades, currently standing (as of January 2025) at about 25,000 (of whom 2,000 are recently returned displaced persons).

== Climate ==
Al-Zabadani has a hot-summer Mediterranean climate (Köppen climate classification: Csa). In winter there is more rainfall than in summer. The average annual temperature in Al-Zabadani is 14.1 °C (57.4 °F). About 510 mm (20.08 in) of precipitation falls annually.

Climate data for Al-Zabadani, elevation 1,200 m (3,900 ft)
Month	Jan	Feb	Mar	Apr	May	Jun	Jul	Aug	Sep	Oct	Nov	Dec	Year
Mean daily maximum °C (°F)	9.0 (48.2)	10.1 (50.2)	13.6 (56.5)	18.1 (64.6)	23.7 (74.7)	28.7 (83.7)	31.2 (88.2)	31.8 (89.2)	29.2 (84.6)	24.3 (75.7)	17.5 (63.5)	11.1 (52.0)	20.7 (69.3)
Daily mean °C (°F)	4.6 (40.3)	5.1 (41.2)	8.3 (46.9)	12.1 (53.8)	16.3 (61.3)	21.0 (69.8)	23.6 (74.5)	24.0 (75.2)	20.7 (69.3)	16.2 (61.2)	10.8 (51.4)	6.0 (42.8)	14.1 (57.3)
Mean daily minimum °C (°F)	0.3 (32.5)	0.3 (32.5)	3.0 (37.4)	6.0 (42.8)	9.0 (48.2)	13.3 (55.9)	15.8 (60.4)	16.0 (60.8)	12.3 (54.1)	8.1 (46.6)	4.1 (39.4)	1.0 (33.8)	7.4 (45.4)
Average precipitation mm (inches)	115 (4.5)	107 (4.2)	78 (3.1)	37 (1.5)	17 (0.7)	0 (0)	0 (0)	0 (0)	1 (0.0)	13 (0.5)	53 (2.1)	99 (3.9)	520 (20.5)
Source: FAO

== History ==
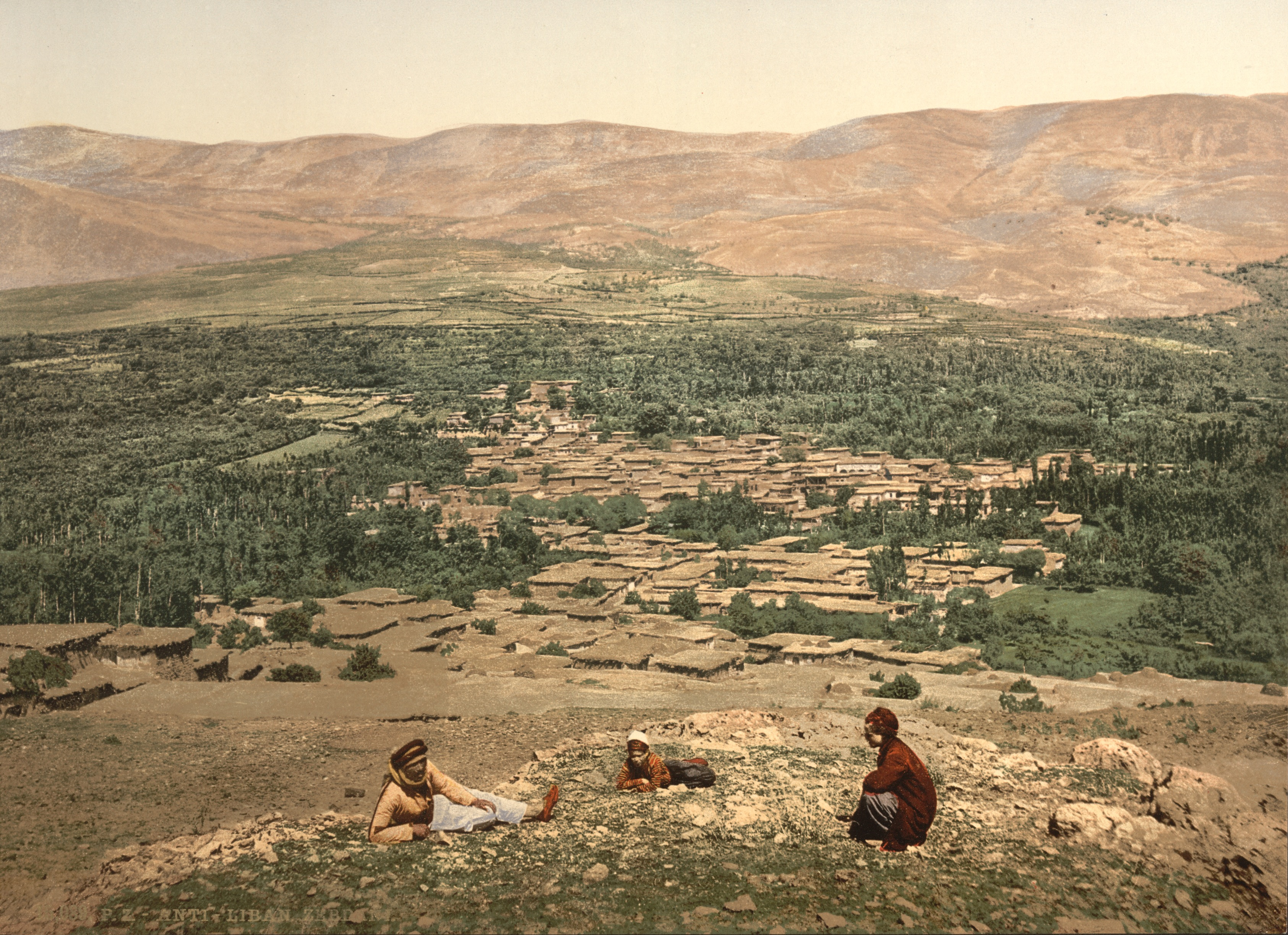
General view of Al-Zabadani, 1890s

In 1838, the population was noted as being Sunni Muslims and Antiochian Greek Christians.

In 1909, J. E. Hanauer mentioned being informed about a large stone revered by Muslim peasants at Neby 'Abdan, a holy site near Zabadani.

=== Syrian Civil War ===
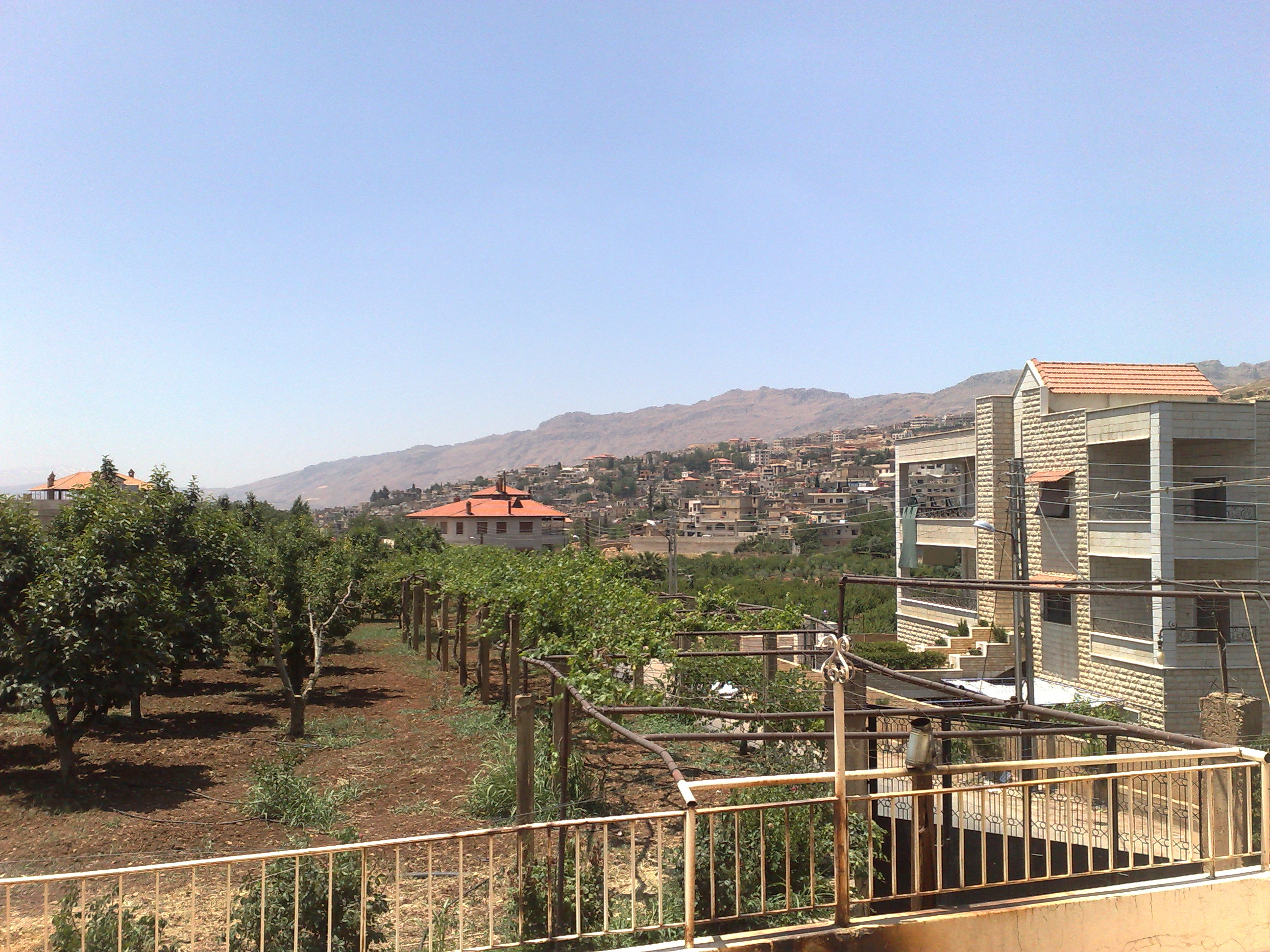
Houses and farms in Zabadani Valley

Al-Zabadani is vitally important to the Syrian government being located along the Lebanon border. It is also strategically important to Iran because, since at least as late as June 2011, it served as the Islamic Revolutionary Guard Corps's logistical hub for supplying Hezbollah.

On 18 January 2012, Zabadani became the first city to fall to the Free Syrian Army (FSA), following a bloody battle that lasted 11 days. The Syrian Army regained control of the city by 11 February.

By late July 2012, Zabadani had become a base of operations for Hezbollah and the Iranian Guards. In August, local Syrian opposition fighters retook 70% of Zabadani with only a few isolated army checkpoints remaining. On 28 February 2014, a truce was reached between government and the rebels. Later it was reported that the truce broke down and that rebels attacked government checkpoints, with the government besieging and shelling the town. On 26 April 2014, the rebels surrendered after intense fighting with government troops, losing their last stronghold along Lebanon's border, only to regain control of the city months later. Following an extended siege by the Syrian Army and Hezbollah, a U.N.-brokered agreement was finally signed in September 2015, under which the city was successively evacuated by the rebels and control ceded back to the Syrian government on 19 April 2017.

== City twinning ==
- Neunkirchen, Saarland, Germany

== See also ==
- Battle of Zabadani (2015)

== Bibliography ==
- Robinson, E.; Smith, E. (1841). Biblical Researches in Palestine, Mount Sinai and Arabia Petraea: A Journal of Travels in the year 1838. Vol. 3. Boston: Crocker & Brewster.
