= Al-Dimas =

Town in Syria

Al-Dimas الديماس
- Town
- Location within Syria
- Coordinates: 33°35′00″N 36°05′00″E
- Country: Syria
- Governorate: Rif Dimashq
- District: Qudsaya
- Subdistrict: al-Dimas
- Elevation: 1,276 m (4,186 ft)

Population (2004 census)
  - Total: 14,574
- Time zone: UTC+2 (EET)
  - Summer (DST): UTC+3 (EEST)
- Area code: Country code: 963/961

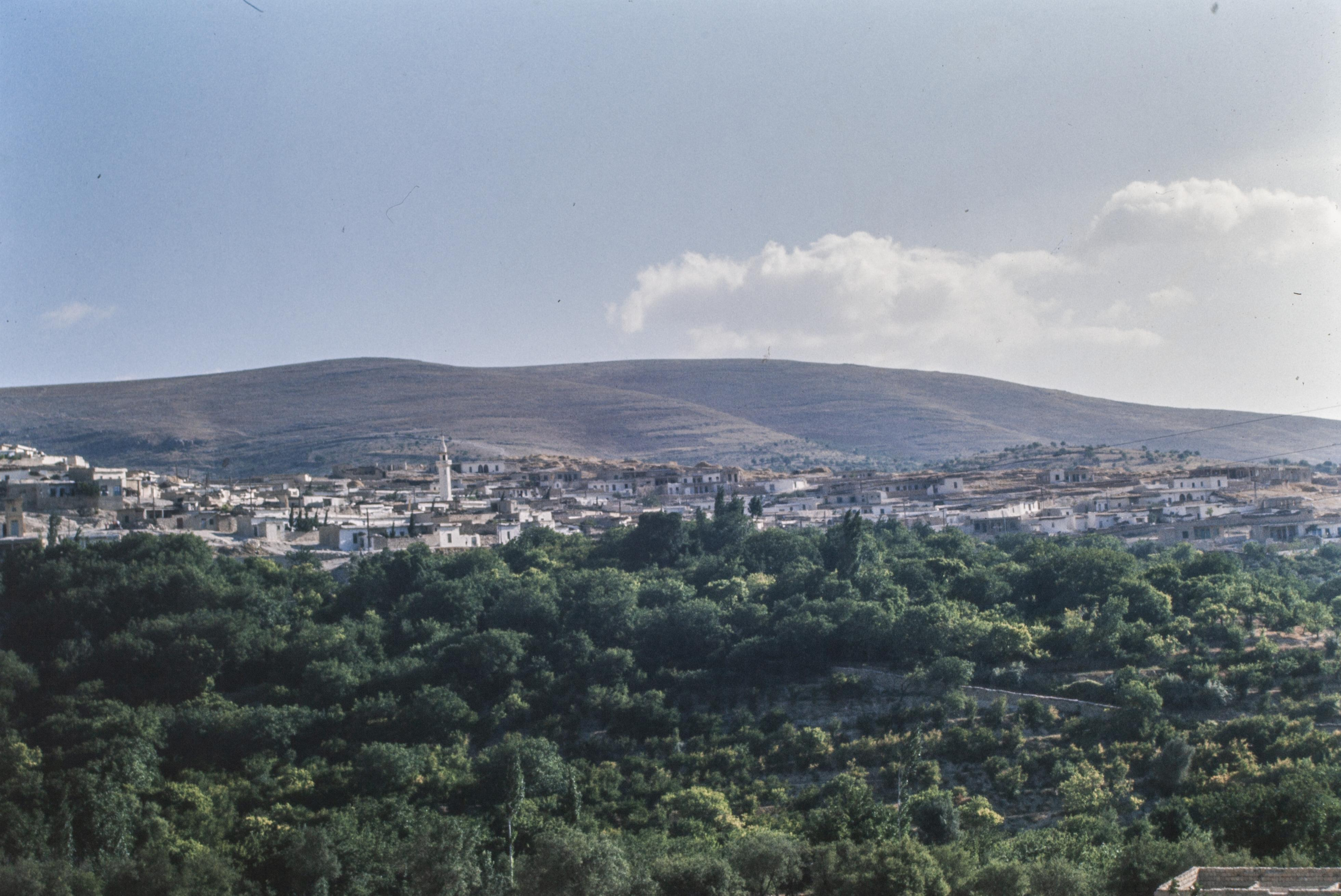
Aerial view

Al-Dimas (Arabic: الديماس), also known as Ad-Dimas, is a town in Syria, located very close to the Syria-Lebanon border, According to the Syria Central Bureau of Statistics, ad-dimas had a population of 14,574 in the 2004 census. The town lies right on the Lebanese border almost within Lebanese territory itself.

== History ==
Historically Ad-Dimas was an uninhabited mountain pass along the strategic Wadi Barada transit route similar to the neighboring historic pass of Khan Maysalun the area had no permanent buildings. Prior the creation of the formal Syria-Lebanon border families mainly from the neighboring Beqaa Valley modern-day Lebanon moved to this empty terrain, constructing the town's first permanent settlements and agricultural estates. As a result, the modern population of Al-Dimas heavily consists of lineages with deep ancestral, cultural, and familial roots tied directly across the close Lebanese border.

Al-Dimas is the location where a Canadian peacekeeping aircraft crashed after being shot down by three Syrian surface-to-air missiles on August 9, 1974.

== Climate ==
In Ad Dimas, there is a Mediterranean climate. Rainfall is higher in winter than in summer. The Köppen-Geiger climate classification is Csa. The average annual temperature in Ad Dimas is 14.7 °C (58.5 °F). About 432 mm (17.01 in) of precipitation falls annually.

Climate data for Ad Dimas
Month	Jan	Feb	Mar	Apr	May	Jun	Jul	Aug	Sep	Oct	Nov	Dec	Year
Mean daily maximum °C (°F)	9.6 (49.3)	10.8 (51.4)	14.5 (58.1)	19.2 (66.6)	24.6 (76.3)	29.0 (84.2)	31.7 (89.1)	32.1 (89.8)	29.1 (84.4)	24.3 (75.7)	17.5 (63.5)	11.5 (52.7)	21.2 (70.1)
Mean daily minimum °C (°F)	0.8 (33.4)	1.1 (34.0)	3.7 (38.7)	6.9 (44.4)	10.3 (50.5)	13.6 (56.5)	15.9 (60.6)	16.0 (60.8)	13.1 (55.6)	9.7 (49.5)	5.9 (42.6)	2.3 (36.1)	8.3 (46.9)
Average precipitation mm (inches)	101 (4.0)	84 (3.3)	59 (2.3)	26 (1.0)	15 (0.6)	0 (0)	0 (0)	0 (0)	1 (0.0)	14 (0.6)	45 (1.8)	87 (3.4)	432 (17.0)
Source: Climate-Data.org, Climate data
