= Ain al-Fijah =

Town in southern Syria

Ain al-Fijah عين الفيجة
- Town
- Location within Syria
- Coordinates: 33.614°N 36.18°E
- Country: Syria
- Governorate: Rif Dimashq
- District: Qudsaya
- Subdistrict: Ain al-Fijah

Population (2004 census)
  - Total: 3,806
- Time zone: UTC+2 (EET)
  - Summer (DST): UTC+3 (EEST)

Ain al-Fijah (Arabic: عين الفيجة, also spelled Ayn al-Fijeh and Ein Al Fejeh) is a small town in southern Syria, administratively part of the Rif Dimashq Governorate, located 25 kilometers northwest of Damascus. Nearby localities include Deir Muqaran to the west, al-Zabadani to the northwest, Basimah to the southeast and Qudsaya to the south. According to the Syria Central Bureau of Statistics, the town had a population of 3,806 in the 2004 census. The town is also the administrative centre of—though not the largest town in—the Ain al-Fijah nahiyah ("subdistrict"), which is made up of six localities with a combined population of 19,584. Its inhabitants are predominantly Sunni Muslims.

== History ==
=== Spring ===
The town was built around the Ain al-Fijah springs (Greek: πηγη, romanized: Pigi, means "Spring"), the source of the Barada River which supplies Damascus with freshwater. In the 1st century CE, the Romans constructed a temple at Ain al-Fijah.

In 1838, Eli Smith noted that Ain al-Fijah’s population was Sunni Muslim.

In 1907, the Ottoman authorities installed the first clean-water pipe at the springs. In 1924 Syrian businessmen Lutfi al-Haffar and Abd al-Wahab al-Qanawati founded the Ain al-Fijah Company, which would use water from the spring for irrigation purposes. Throughout the early 20th century, the company was one of the most profitable and innovative in Damascus.

=== Syrian Civil War ===
Ain al-Fijah came into the spotlight during the ongoing Syrian Civil War when in December 2016, its water processing facility was destroyed, cutting off supply from the spring and thereby depriving Damascus 70 per cent of its water supply. The Syrian government and the rebels seeking to depose it had previously had an understanding to keep water services running during the war, but this came to an end in mid-December, when government forces launched an offensive to take the town after accusing rebels of contaminating the water supply with petroleum. The spring was destroyed on 22 December, and sources are unclear of who destroyed it, with the government and opposition blaming each other.

On March 14, 2017, the U.N. Independent International Commission of Inquiry on Syria said that the Syria's air force deliberately bombed water sources in December, a war crime that cut off water for 5.5 million people in and around the capital Damascus. The commission said it had found no evidence of deliberate contamination of the water supply or demolition by armed groups, as the Syrian government maintained at the time.

Activists in Barada had said that the government and their Russian allies bombed the facility, puncturing the fuel depots and contaminating the water stream. The plant's electrical control systems had also been destroyed. By contrast, Damascus officials said they were forced to shut off the water after rebels contaminated it. Government officials denied attacking the water facility, saying it would not do anything to harm its own population. In either case, the shut-off of the water supply caused a large humanitarian crisis in Damascus, as civilians were forced to rely on ground wells and distribution points for their water.

On 15 January 2017, a deal was reached to repair the damage to water supply. Syrian government workers entered the town to begin restoring water to the capital after weeks of shortages, and the plan was to fix it in three days. However, fighting continued the following day completely derailing the plan. Armed men killed the head of the negotiation team overseeing the repair agreement, and both sides blamed each other for this.

The offensive against Ain al-Fijah continued, and on 19 January, the opposition and the Syrian government reached a ceasefire agreement which included measures to repair the water-pumping station and further outlined steps for the amnesty or evacuation of Barada's opposition fighters. However, very shortly after the ceasefire was agreed, it collapsed as government and rebel forces exchanged fire with barrel bombs, mortars and machine gun fire. Airstrikes also reportedly killed women and children. The collapse came just before the commencement of the International Meeting on Syrian Settlement, a conference held as part of the Syrian peace process in Astana, Kazakhstan. The conference concluded on 24 January, with Bashar Jaafari, the U.N. envoy representing the Syrian government, insisting that the ceasefire beginning in December 2016 did not apply to the territory of Wadi Barada because of the presence of terrorists, something which the rebel opposition denied.

== Bibliography ==
- Grehan, James P. (2007). Everyday Life and Consumer Culture in Eighteenth-Century Damascus. University of Washington Press. ISBN 978-0295801636.
- Moubayed, Sami M. (2006). Steel & Silk: Men & Women Who Shaped Syria 1900–2000. Cune Press. pp. 235–238. ISBN 1-885942-41-9.
- Robinson, E.; Smith, E. (1841). Biblical Researches in Palestine, Mount Sinai and Arabia Petraea: A Journal of Travels in the year 1838. Vol. 3. Boston: Crocker & Brewster.
