= April 2018 missile strikes against Syria =

Military strikes by US, UK, France against government sites in Syria

2018 missile strikes against Syria
- Part of US strikes on Ba'athist Syria, the US intervention in the Syrian civil war and the foreign involvement in the Syrian civil war
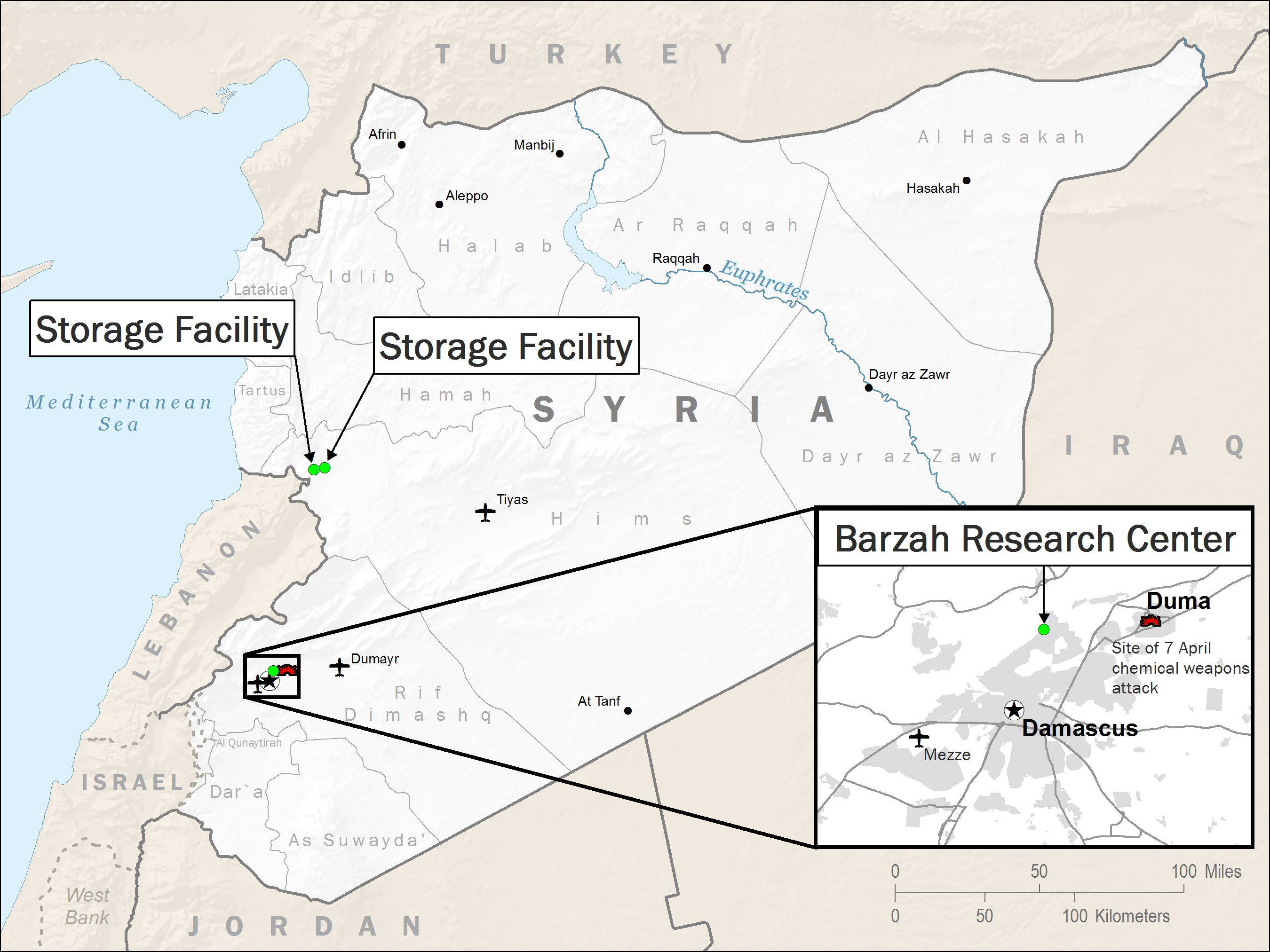
- A map of the attack sites, according to the US Department of Defense
- Location: Ba'athist Syria
- Planned by: France; United Kingdom; United States
- Commanded by: (France) Emmanuel Macron (United States) Donald Trump (United Kingdom) Theresa May
- Objective: Degrade Syria's facilities for production of chemical weapons and deter their use
- Date: 14 April 2018
- Executed by: United States Air Force; United States Navy; Royal Air Force; Royal Navy; French Air Force; French Navy
- Outcome: All targets either destroyed or severely damaged (US claim); Minimal damage (Syrian claim)
- Casualties: 6 soldiers and 3 civilians injured (Syrian government claim)

On 14 April 2018, beginning at 04:00 Syrian time (UTC+3), the United States, France, and the United Kingdom carried out a series of military strikes involving aircraft and ship-based missiles against multiple government sites in Syria during the Syrian Civil War. The strikes were a reprisal for the Douma chemical attack against civilians on 7 April, widely attributed to the Syrian Ba'athist government. The Syrian government called the airstrikes a violation of international law.

== Background ==
A Syrian government offensive to recapture the rebel-held Eastern Ghouta suburb began in February 2018. The offensive was condemned by Western media and human rights organizations for its reportedly brutal humanitarian consequences. By the beginning of April, Douma was one of the last rebel enclaves remaining in the region, with rebel group Jaysh al-Islam in control of the city. Russian and Syrian state media reported a deal between the rebel group and Russia to hand over Douma to government control. Other news agencies reported members of the rebel group claiming a deal had not been brokered and that Jaysh al-Islam would not surrender Douma. What followed was a suspected chemical attack carried out in the Syrian city of Douma on 7 April 2018, with at least 70 people reported killed. One pro-opposition source said that a thousand people suffered from the effects. The Jaysh al-Islam rebel group, which controlled Douma at the time, along with several medical, monitoring, and activist groups, including the pro-rebel White Helmets (Syria Civil Defence), all reported that two Syrian Air Force Mi-8 helicopters had dropped barrel bombs. The bombs were filled with chlorine gas and possibly sarin. The World Health Organization said it received reports from partner agencies that some 500 people arrived at health facilities showing "signs and symptoms consistent with exposure to toxic chemicals." On 6 July 2018, the OPCW produced an interim report stating that chlorine residues had been found at the two attack sites, although no organophosphorous nerve agents or their degradation products were detected.

As with previous incidents, France, the United Kingdom, the United States, and other nations accused the Syrian government of being responsible for the use of chemical weapons. Russia and Iran, the Syrian government's main allies, denied chemical weapons had been used, claiming it was a false flag operation. Russia has said video of the chemical attack was staged by members of the White Helmets. Syrian Arab News Agency (SANA) said that the Saudi Arabian-backed Jaysh al-Islam was making "chemical attack fabrications in an exposed and failed attempt to obstruct advances by the Syrian Arab Army".

In May 2017, French President Emmanuel Macron said the use of chemical weapons in Syria would be a red line requiring immediate reprisal. France and the United States cited positive urine and blood samples collected as proof of chlorine being used in Douma.

In the early hours of 9 April 2018, an airstrike was conducted against Tiyas Military Airbase in Syria. The United States denied launching the airstrike, and an Israeli spokeswoman declined to comment. On 10 April, an emergency United Nations Security Council meeting was held where competing solutions were presented on how to handle the response to the chemical attack; all were eventually vetoed by Russia. By 11 April, Western nations began to consider military action in Syria, seeking a "strong joint response." On the same day, the Syrian government said it invited the Organisation for the Prohibition of Chemical Weapons to investigate the sites of the attacks. "Syria is keen on cooperating with the OPCW to uncover the truth behind the allegations that some western sides have been advertising to justify their aggressive intentions," said SANA, quoting an official source in the Foreign Ministry. Russia denied chemical weapons were used, and on 13 April, blamed Britain for staging the event in order to provoke US airstrikes.

By 12 April, British Prime Minister Theresa May had ordered Royal Navy submarines in the Mediterranean to move within cruise missile range of Syria by the end of the week. British military sources later told The Times that days before the missile strikes a British Astute-class submarine armed with Tomahawk missiles and approaching within firing range of Syrian military targets was chased by "one, and possibly two" Russian Kilo-class submarines from the Russian Navy base at Tartus. The Russian submarines were supported by two frigates and an antisubmarine aircraft, while the British submarine was assisted by a US Navy P-8 Poseidon patrol aircraft. Ultimately, no British submarine took part in the strikes.

== Military action ==
=== International law ===
The United Nations Charter requires a mandate from the United Nations Security Council for sovereign states to use force for the purpose of maintaining international security, but not for acting in self-defence or the protection of populations threatened by extermination at the hands of their own government. Since the UN Charter came into effect in 1945, military action in retaliation or reprisal to the act of another state has been prohibited; but a reprisal may be justified if its aim is to force the other state into compliance with its international obligations. Russia's use of its veto meant there was no prospect of the Security Council authorizing the use of force. Therefore, military action relies on an international public order argument based on defending the credibility of the prohibition of the use of chemical weapons, enforcing Syria's obligations under the terms of its membership of the Chemical Weapons Convention, and protecting civilians from further chemical weapon attacks to alleviate humanitarian suffering.

The strikes came hours before inspectors from the OPCW Fact-Finding Mission were due to arrive in Syria to investigate the attack.

The United Kingdom published its legal position regarding military action which concluded limited strikes are justified on humanitarian grounds. After the strikes, the UK Parliament debated the considerations under international law regarding the urgency of the intervention, and whether there was a lack of practical alternatives.

=== Forces involved ===
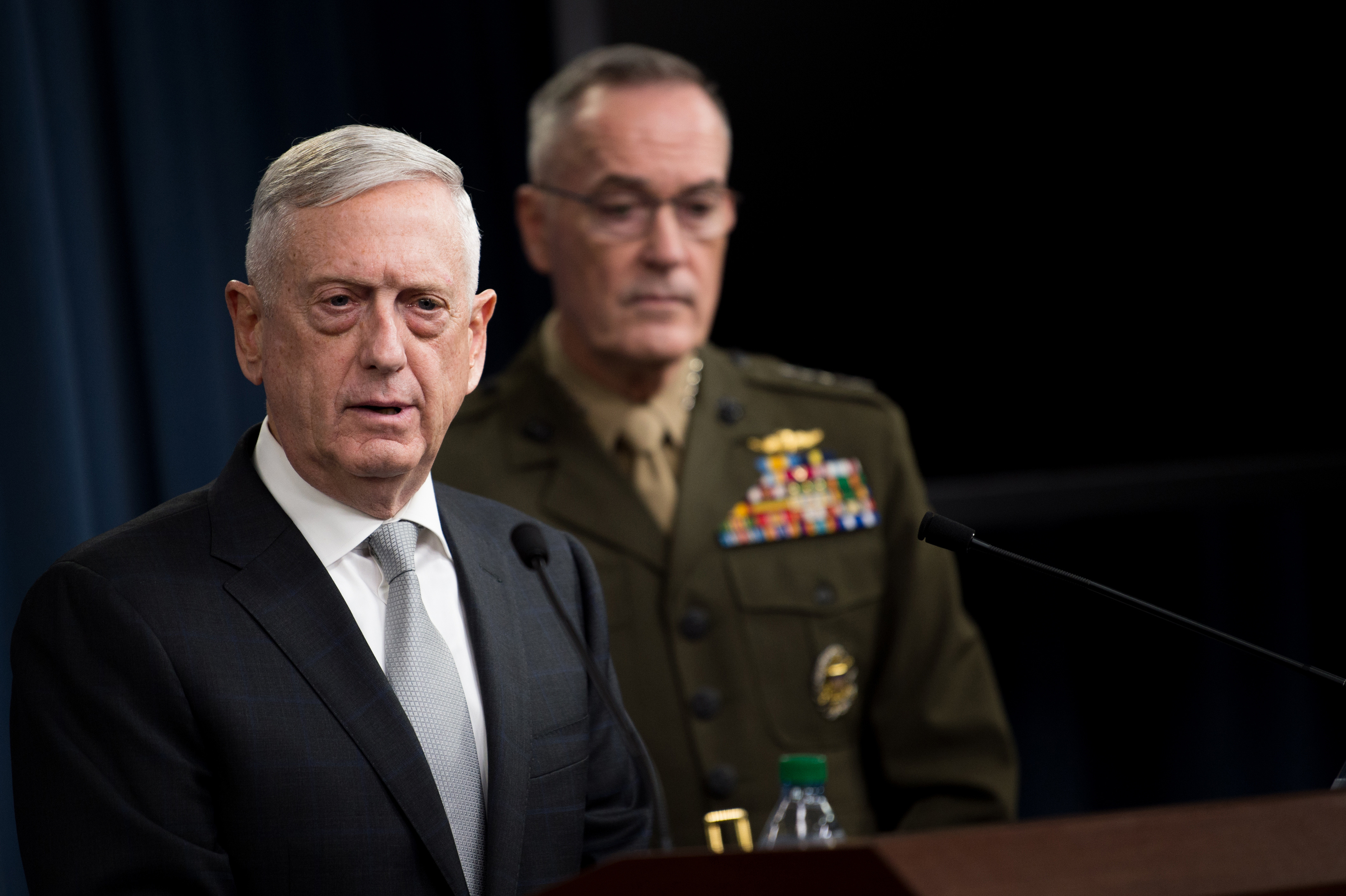
US Secretary of Defense Jim Mattis and Chairman of the Joint Chiefs of Staff Joseph Dunford briefing reporters on the attack

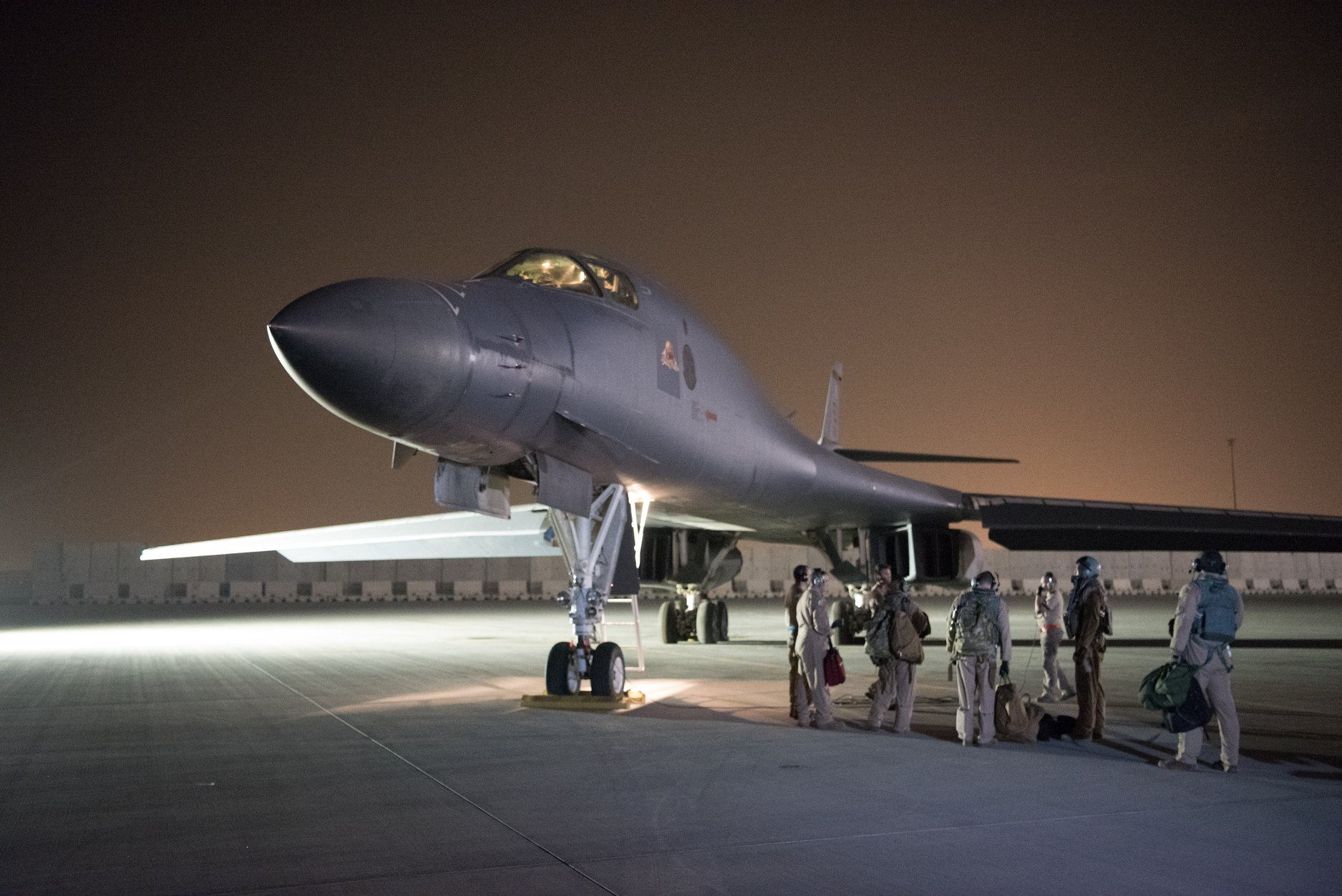
A B-1B of 28th Bomb Wing preparing to launch a strike mission from Al Udeid Air Base

The strikes were carried out by the forces of the United States, the United Kingdom, and France and were delivered by ship-launched, submarine-launched and airborne cruise missiles. All of the missiles launched by British and French forces were either Storm Shadow (SCALP EG) missiles, or Missile de Croisière Naval (MdCN for Naval Cruise Missile) sea-launched cruise missiles in French service.

Flying from RAF Akrotiri in Cyprus, four Royal Air Force Tornado GR4 fighters of No. 31 Squadron, supported by four Eurofighter Typhoon air superiority fighters of No. 6 Squadron, fired a total of eight Storm Shadow missiles. The Royal Navy deployed the Type 45 destroyer, HMS Duncan, to provide air defense for allied naval forces. The French Navy deployed a strike group in the Eastern Mediterranean consisting of the Cassard-class frigate Cassard, the Georges Leygues-class frigate Jean de Vienne, the Durance-class tanker Var, and the FREMM multipurpose frigates Aquitaine, Auvergne, and Languedoc; the latter ship fired three MdCN land attack missiles. The French strike group was accompanied by the US Navy Virginia-class submarine USS John Warner, which launched six Tomahawk cruise missiles.

The French Air Force participation in the strikes consisted of five Rafale B fighters from the Escadron de Chasse 1/4 Gascogne based at Saint-Dizier Air Base, each carrying two SCALP EG missiles, four Mirage 2000-5F air superiority fighters from the Escadron de chasse 1/2 Cigognes from Luxeuil Air Base, two E-3F airborne early warning and control planes from the 36e Escadre de commandement et de conduite aéroportée Berry from Avord Air Base, and six C-135FR tankers from the Groupe de ravitaillement en vol 2/91 Bretagne from Istres Air Base.

US forces included two US Air Force B-1B Lancer bombers from the 34th Bomb Squadron, which fired a total of nineteen JASSM missiles after taking off from Al Udeid Air Base in Qatar. They were accompanied by four F-22A Raptor air superiority fighters from the 95th Fighter Squadron, two KC-10 Extender tankers from the 908th Expeditionary Air Refueling Squadron and one US Marine Corps EA-6B Prowler electronic-warfare aircraft from VMAQ-2, which all departed from Al Dhafra Air Base in the United Arab Emirates. Immediately after the strike it was claimed that long-range JASSM-ER had been fired by the two B-1B Lancer bombers, but five days later, the U.S. Air Force Central Command issued a correction saying that actually older JASSM-A were used. From a position in the Red Sea the US Navy Arleigh Burke-class destroyer USS Laboon fired seven and the Ticonderoga-class cruiser USS Monterey thirty Tomahawk cruise missiles, while the Arleigh Burke-class destroyer USS Higgins fired twenty-three Tomahawks from a position in the northern part of the Persian Gulf. The Arleigh Burke-class destroyer, USS Donald Cook was reported to have participated in order to mislead defending forces, firing no missiles. US Secretary of Defense Jim Mattis said twice as many weapons were used in the strike as in the 2017 Shayrat missile strike; an anonymous US Defense Department official quoted by The Washington Post said about 100 Tomahawk missiles were fired by the US.

The US Air Force also deployed a fighter group over the Eastern Mediterranean in the air-superiority and defensive-counter-air role, which consisted of at least eight F-15C Eagle fighters from the 493d Fighter Squadron and seven F-16C Falcon fighters from the 510th Fighter Squadron. The fighters were accompanied by at least two KC-135 Stratotanker aircraft from the 351st Air Refueling Squadron.

According to US military's Director of the Joint Staff, the allocation of missiles to targets was:

- Barzah scientific research centre (Damascus): 57 Tomahawk and 19 JASSM missiles.
- Him Shanshar military installation storage site (west of Homs): 9 Tomahawk, 8 Storm Shadow, 3 MdCN, and 2 SCALP missiles.
- Him Shanshar military installation bunker: 7 SCALP missiles.

Syria responded using its air defense systems, and its state media aired a video purporting to show a successful missile interception. The Syrian state news agency SANA and Colonel-General Sergei Rudskoi of the Russian military said Syria used Russian and Soviet air defense systems Pantsir-S1, S-125, S-200, Buk, and Kvadrat.

=== Strikes ===
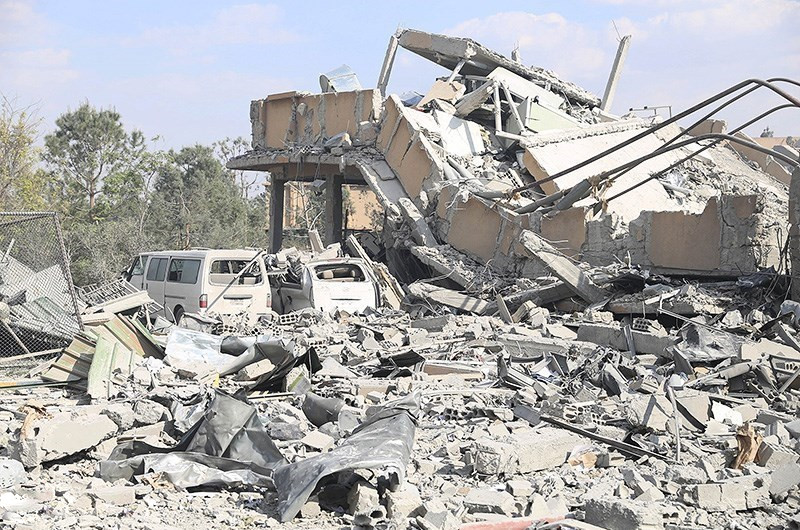
Buildings destroyed by allied missile strikes, 14 April 2018

President Trump delivers his announcement at 21:00 EST (0100 UTC).

Explosions near Dummar, Syria

President Donald Trump announced the strikes at 9 pm EDT, 13 April (4 AM, 14 April in Syria, 2 AM in London, 3 AM in Paris) along with allies France and the United Kingdom. Explosions were heard in Damascus, the capital of Syria, just as Trump was speaking. According to US Chairman of the Joint Chiefs of Staff Joseph Dunford, Russia had not been warned in advance of the incoming attack; he was contradicted by other American and French officials.

US Chairman of the Joint Chiefs of Staff Joseph Dunford said three sites were targeted: a scientific research center in Damascus, a chemical weapons storage facility west of Homs, and an equipment storage facility and command post also near Homs. The UK Ministry of Defence reported British aircraft struck the Him Shanshar chemical weapons precursor storage site 15 miles west of Homs. Witnesses reported loud explosions and smoke in the capital Damascus in the early morning, including in the Barzeh neighborhood, the site of the Barzah scientific research centre, a major research establishment. The strike destroyed what employees of the facility characterised as a Syrian antivenom medical center, but which US General Joseph Dunford described as a center for research, development, production and testing of chemical and biological weapons. The Syrian Observatory for Human Rights (SOHR) said the attack sites included a scientific research center in Damascus and another in the Homs area, as well as military bases in Damascus and Homs. The US armed forces said all missiles hit their intended targets without interference, and according to Lieutenant General Kenneth McKenzie, the Syrian air defences fired 40 intercepting surface-to-air missiles but failed to hit any of the targets. He said most were fired after the last incoming missile had struck its target. Similarly, France said none of the twelve missiles it fired appear to have been intercepted, although there were reports that between three and seven French missiles were not fired due to malfunctions. The Syrian Army said it "intercepted most of the missiles", while the Syrian state media reported its air defenses shot down 13 incoming missiles near Al-Kiswah, south of Damascus. The Russian military reported Syria's air defences shot down 71 of 103 cruise missiles, and listed various airports and airbases, not mentioned by US military sources, as having been targeted partly or completely unsuccessfully. The SOHR, which is cited by many western media organisations, reported no known casualties, but stated there was considerable material damage while also saying that the Syrian Air Defense Force intercepted and downed at least 65 missiles. Syria's state-run TV news reported three civilians injured at Homs, and that the missile strike there was "aborted".

== Aftermath ==
Workers at a destroyed laboratory denied ever making any chemical weapons.

Russia called for an emergency meeting of the United Nations Security Council on 14 April, but the resolution it brought to the session condemning the attacks failed to pass, with only Bolivia and China supporting it. Nikki Haley, Permanent Representative of the United States to the UN, said the United States was "locked and loaded", should the Syrian government use chemical weapons again. A further meeting of the Security Council was scheduled to be held on 16 April, to discuss a resolution presented jointly by France, the UK, and the US. The resolution calls for an independent inquiry into the use of chemical weapons in Syria, medical evacuations, and the safe passage of aid convoys across the country.

The effectiveness and impact of the strike has been downplayed by analysts. In Syria, the strikes were interpreted as a victory for Bashar al-Assad, because their limited scope was seen as indicating that Western countries no longer intended to seriously challenge his rule. According to Russian state media, the governor of Russia's autonomous Khanty-Mansiysk district said after meeting with Assad that "President Assad was in absolutely positive spirits. He is in a good mood." American Director of the Joint Staff, Lt. Gen Kenneth McKenzie, said the air strikes were a "severe blow" to the development of Syria's chemical weapons and that the United States military is "ready anytime" in the event of retaliation by the Syrian government.

The activity of web brigades increased by "2,000%" following the attack, according to Chief Pentagon spokesperson Dana W. White. The UK's National Cyber Security Centre, the FBI, and the US Department of Homeland Security issued a joint alert warning of a Russian global hacking campaign.

According to Syrian state television, Syrian air defenses intercepted missiles that targeted Shayrat Airbase "late Monday night" (16 April); however, the Pentagon spokesman said the US military was not active at the time, while an Israeli military spokesman declined to comment. Hezbollah's media unit claimed Syrian air defenses had also intercepted three missiles which targeted Al-Dumayr Military Airport; a commander in the regional military alliance backing the government told Reuters that it was a false alarm and part of an "electronic attack" by Israel and the US on the Syrian radar system.

According to Jane's IHS, on 25 April 2018, the Russian Ministry of Defence (MoD) "appeared to contradict" the MoD's earlier 16 April account, and was now stating that 22 (rather than 32) missiles hit their targets, that 66 (rather than 71) were intercepted, and those other incoming missiles had suffered technical malfunctions. According to Russia, 46 missiles were intercepted in five areas of the capital of Syria and Duvali, Dumayr, Blai, and Mazzeh nearby airfields, and 20 missiles were intercepted in three areas of the Homs air defense zone. The MoD did agree that the U.S. hit all three of the publicly targeted sites. The MoD also displayed remnants of SCALP and Storm Shadow missiles purportedly shot down; Jane's stated that "The missile remnants it displayed could have come from missiles that hit their targets or failed in a previous attack". Russian government sources claimed they had recovered as duds one Tomahawk and one 'precision air launched' missile, and would study them to improve their own weapons systems; the US denied the claims as "absurd".

On 21 April, the OPCW Fact-Finding Mission visited a site in Douma to collect samples, and on 25 April visited a second site in Douma to collect further samples. The team also interviewed people related to incident in Damascus. On 4 May, the OPCW announced that the initial deployment of the Fact-Finding Mission in Douma was complete. Analysis of the samples may take at least three to four weeks.

== Statements and reactions ==
The Syrian state media called the attack a "flagrant violation of international law".

=== Domestic reaction ===
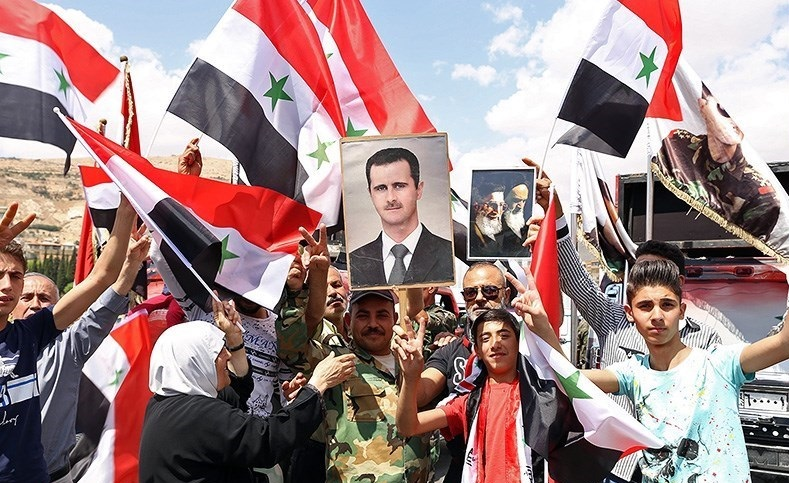
Demonstration in Damascus after the strikes

Within Syria the strikes, and the response of Syria's air defence units, was seen as a victory for the Government of President Assad. Crowds gathered in the streets of Damascus the following morning to celebrate what they said was the success of the Syrian Army.

=== Belligerent nations ===
French President Emmanuel Macron said in a statement on 14 April that France's "red line has been crossed", referring to the previous attacks on Douma.

While announcing the strikes, UK Prime Minister Theresa May said there was "no practicable alternative to the use of force" to deal with the Syrian government's use of chemical weapons. Opposition politicians condemned the strikes, with many questioning May's decision to press ahead without obtaining parliamentary approval first. Leader of the Opposition Jeremy Corbyn called the strikes "legally questionable", said "Bombs won't save lives or bring about peace", although some of his party's MPs backed the strikes. He also said that "while much suspicion rightly points to the Assad government", other groups had carried out similar attacks and weapons inspectors must continue their investigation.

US President Donald Trump announced the strikes in a televised address, arguing they were part of the effort to stop Assad from using chemical weapons, and said the US was "prepared to sustain this response" until this was achieved. Dana W. White, The Pentagon Chief Spokesperson, said "this operation does not represent a change in US policy or an attempt to depose the Syrian regime". The New York Times reported the reactions initially broke among partisan lines, with members of the Republican Party—the party of President Donald Trump—being generally supportive while the Democrats were generally critical. Republicans Tom Cotton and Orrin Hatch praised the strikes. Other US lawmakers, in particular Democrats, although generally supportive of a limited strike to punish Assad for using banned chemical weapons, criticized the Trump administration for not seeking Congressional approval and for not having a "coherent Syria Strategy". Democratic senator Tim Kaine re-emphasized his long-held belief that the military intervention without Congressional authorization and long-term strategy are "illegal" and "reckless".

On 19 April, at a Pentagon press briefing, American Director of the Joint Staff Lt. Gen. Kenneth McKenzie affirmed that Russian air defenses - which included advanced S-400 missile systems - were active but did not engage any missiles during the operation. "Russian air defenses were energized. They were scanning. They had a mainstay [sic] air defense aircraft up. They did not choose to engage, so I cannot speculate about why they did or did not do that," McKenzie stated, while denying that any missiles were shot down by Syrian air defenses.

=== Syrian-allied states ===
The Iran Foreign Ministry condemned the missile strikes, said there is "no proof" of Syrian responsibility in the chemical attack on Douma, and criticized the United States for attacking without waiting for an Organisation for the Prohibition of Chemical Weapons investigation. Ali Khamenei, the Supreme Leader of Iran, called Trump, May and Macron "criminals" and warned "they will gain nothing" from the strike.

Russian politician Alexander Sherin referred to the strike as a terrorist attack and compared it to Operation Barbarossa. Russian President Vladimir Putin described the strikes as an "act of aggression". Russia also called for an emergency meeting of the United Nations Security Council. Anatoly Antonov, the Russian ambassador to the United States, strongly condemned the coalition attacks on Syria and warned the Western countries of "consequences". Sergei Rudskoi, a Russian Colonel-General, in a TV briefing, said Russia may consider sending S-300 surface-to-air missile systems to Syria and other countries.

=== Other NATO member states ===
Albania, Bulgaria, Canada, Croatia, the Czech Republic, Denmark, Estonia, Germany, Greece, Italy, the Netherlands, Poland, Romania, Spain, and Turkey all agreed the decision to attack was justified.

=== Supranational organizations ===
Secretary-General of the United Nations António Guterres called for restraint from all states.

President of the European Council Donald Tusk confirmed the European Union's support for the strikes as did High Representative of the Union for Foreign Affairs and Security Policy Federica Mogherini. Secretary General of NATO Jens Stoltenberg supported the strikes in a statement.

The Collective Security Treaty Organization condemned the strikes as violating norms of international law.

=== Non-state organizations ===
Mohammed Alloush, a key member of the Jaysh al-Islam (a coalition of Salafist and Islamist rebel groups) criticized the missile strikes for not going far enough, writing on Twitter that the airstrikes were a "farce" and an example of punishing "the instrument of the crime while keeping the criminal [in power]". In a press statement released on 14 April 2018, Hamas spokesman Fawzi Barhoum that the organization "condemns in the strongest terms" the airstrikes, describing them as "blatant aggression on Syrian soil [with the aim] to destroy its capabilities in order to preserve the existence of the Zionist entity". The Lebanese Shia militant resistance group/political party Hezbollah sharply condemned the US, French, and British airstrikes on Syria, praising the Arab neighbor's air defense for confronting the missile attacks.

=== Religious organizations ===
Moran Mor Ignatius Aphrem II, the patriarch of the Syriac Orthodox Church, and Patriarch John X of Antioch, primate of the Greek Orthodox Patriarchate of Antioch and All The East, issued a joint condemnation of the strikes. They said the bombings "were clear violation of the international laws and the UN Charter", and that the "unjust aggression encourages the terrorist organizations and gives them momentum to continue in their terrorism."

=== Public opposition in the West ===
Protests against the strikes occurred in the United Kingdom in April 2018, including in London (organised by the Stop the War Coalition, which said the strikes risked "causing a catastrophic war with Russia") and Bristol, Exeter, Swansea and Milton Keynes. The British Campaign for Nuclear Disarmament described the decision of the government to carry out airstrikes in Syria as defying international law and criticised Prime Minister Theresa May for bypassing parliament in her decision on the matter. The British Stop the War Coalition condemned the missile strikes in a public statement in April 2018. Public opinion on the missile strikes was "evenly split" according to a report by The Week.

== See also ==
- 2017 Shayrat missile strike
- September 2016 Deir ez-Zor air raid
- International reactions to the 2013 Ghouta chemical attack § Military options
- Operation Odyssey Dawn
- List of United States attacks on Syria during the Syrian civil war
