= Ghayth Armanazi =

Syrian media specialist and diplomat (born 1943)

Ghayth Armanazi (born 1943) is a Syrian media specialist and former diplomat based in London, England. He is a former ambassador of the Arab League and former head of the Arab Bankers Association. He is the author of The Story of Syria (2017), published by Gilgamesh Publishing.

== Background ==
Born in Damascus, Syria, Armanazi was educated at the Universities of Colorado and London. His father, Najib Armanazi, was Syrian ambassador to India and Egypt.

He is the brother of Amr Armanazi, the former head of the Syrian Scientific Studies and Research Center, who was sanctioned for leading the development and procurement of weapon technology for Ba'athist Syria.

He became a British Citizen during the Syrian civil war and lives in London.

== Public roles ==
He was Head of the London Mission of the Arab League from 1992–2000. He previously worked for the Foreign Ministry of the United Arab Emirates, and also pursued a career in banking.

He currently heads the Syrian Media Centre, London, and is Executive Director of the British-Syrian Society.

Armanazi has long been identified with discernibly Syrian diplomatic viewpoints. Sympathetic observers will credit Syria's long-standing diplomatic positions with great consistency; critics will regard Syria's stance regarding the Palestinians and the Golan Heights as 'hardline': a term which Armanazi himself rejects.

Regarding Syrian communities in other countries, Armanazi has sought to highlight their dynamism and adaptability, pointing out that Syrian expatriates have been able to assimilate well into the various societies which have received them.

== See also ==
- Foreign relations of Syria
