= Amr Armanazi =

- عمرو الأرمنازي

Director General of the Syrian Scientific Studies and Research Center
- In office 1999–2021

Personal details
- Born: 7 February 1944 Syria
- Parent: Father: Najib Armanazi
- Relatives: Brother: Ghayth Armanazi
- Occupation: Engineer

Amr Armanazi (Arabic: عمرو الأرمنازي born 7 February 1944) is the former head of the Syrian Scientific Studies and Research Center (SSRC) of the Syrian Arab Republic. He was sanctioned by the United States, European Union and United Kingdom and other nations for overseeing the chemical warfare development of the Assad regime.

== Family and personal life ==
Amr Armanazi is the son of former Syrian diplomat Najib Armanazi. His father was Syrian ambassador to India and Egypt. Amrs older brother Ghayth Armanazi followed in his fathers footsteps becoming a diplomat for the Arab League and working for the foreign ministry of the United Arab Emirates.

== Education and early career ==
Armanazi earned a bachelor's degree in electrical engineering at the American University of Beirut. He continued his education at Columbia University in the United States, where he earned a master's degree and a doctorate in electrical engineering. He was president of the Organization of Arab Students at Columbia University.

He worked for the Bell Labs as a researcher between 1971 and 1976 before returning to Syria, where he joined the Scientific Studies and Research Center. He started working in the field of information technology, developing computer research within the Scientific Studies and Research Center. He was a director of the Syrian Computer Society when it was headed by Bashar al-Assad.

== Director General of the Scientific Studies and Research Center ==
Armanazi was named Director General of the Scientific Studies and Research Center in 1999 by then-president Hafez al-Assad. In this capacity he also headed the Technological Branch for Military Targets, that was tasked with developing weapons of mass destruction for the Syrian regime, including the Syrian nuclear program. Under his leadership, the SSRC developed chemical weapons and carrier systems to use them. This included managing a series of front companies to procure missile components for use during the Syrian civil war.

During his time at the head of the Scientific Studies and Research Center, he also held other academic positions in Syria and the wider Arab world, including as a trustee of the Arab International University and the Syrian Virtual University.

In 2012, he was sanctioned by the European Union and United States for his role in procuring and developing weapons for the Syrian Arab Armed Forces which were used in the surveillance and armed suppression of protestors during the 2011 Syrian protests and in the Syrian civil war. He was also listed on the UK sanctions list in 2020, after the UK left the European Union.

== Later life ==
Armanazi retired from his role in the Scientific Studies and Research Center in 2021. He stayed in Damascus after the fall of the Assad regime.
