= List of United States attacks on Syria during the Syrian civil war =

Dynamic list of attacks against the Syrian government by the United States since 2011

The following is a list of United States's attacks on forces belonging to, or allied with the Syrian Ba'athist government during the Syrian Civil War. Other than the April 2017 Shayrat missile strike and the April 2018 missile strikes, all other attacks were officially announced by the Pentagon as having been carried out in defense of either the Syrian Democratic Forces or the Revolutionary Commando Army in Al-Tanf.

The United States claimed that some attacks were accidental, such as the September 2016 Deir ez-Zor air raid, which killed 50 Syrian Army and allied troops.

== List of attacks ==

=== Intentional attacks ===
Date	Location	Notes	Ref.
April 7, 2017	Shayrat Airbase, Western Homs Governorate	Main article: 2017 Shayrat missile strike U.S. President Donald Trump ordered an airstrike against the Syrian government in response to the Khan Shaykhun chemical attack on 4 April. The United States gave Syria's ally, Russia, advance warning of the airstrike, allowing the government to move away most planes from the airbase ahead of time. 9 to 20 aircraft were destroyed and seven to nine soldiers were killed, including a general.	
May 18, 2017	Al-Tanf, Eastern Homs Governorate	See also: 2017 Syrian Desert campaign U.S. aircraft conducted airstrikes against vehicles, including a tank and bulldozer belonging to pro-government militias that were setting up fighting positions within the Al-Tanf deconfliction zone. Two vehicles were destroyed and 2 soldiers were killed.	
June 6, 2017	Al-Tanf, Eastern Homs Governorate	U.S. aircraft conducted airstrikes on over 20 troops, a tank, artillery, antiaircraft weapons, and armed technical vehicles from pro-government forces that had entered the Al-Tanf deconfliction zone. The attack destroyed two artillery pieces, an anti-aircraft gun, and damaged a tank.	
June 8, 2017	Al-Tanf, Eastern Homs Governorate	U.S. F-15E shoots down an armed Syrian-operated drone and another aircraft destroys two armed pick-up trucks belonging to pro-government forced that moved near U.S. backed fighters at Al-Tanf.	
June 18, 2017	Ja'Din, Eastern Southern Raqqa Governorate	Main article: Ja'Din shootdown incident U.S. FA-18E/F shoots down a Syrian Air Force SU-22 after it allegedly bombed SDF fighters in Ja'Din. A Syrian Army statement claimed the aircraft was on a mission striking ISIL militants and had ejected after being hit and was later saved.	
June 20, 2017	Al-Tanf, Eastern Homs Governorate	U.S. F-15E shoots down an armed Syrian-operated Shahed 129 drone that advanced towards U.S. backed fighters at Al-Tanf.	
February 7, 2018	Khasham, Central Deir ez-Zor Governorate	Main article: Battle of Khasham The U.S.-led Coalition forces conducted air and artillery strikes to destroy pro-government forces that were advancing against a SDF headquarters, which was housing U.S.-led Coalition service members at the time. Over 100 Russian mercenaries were reported to have been killed and hundreds more were injured. However, Syrian state media announced that 10 Russian mercenaries had been killed.	
February 10, 2018	Al Tabiyeh, Central Deir ez-Zor Governorate	A U.S. MQ-9 Reaper drone destroys a T-72 tank of pro-government forces in an air strike near the Al Tabiyeh gas field. The tank itself was not firing on the SDF and the coalition, but other elements in the formation were.	
April 14, 2018	Damascus, Damascus Governorate / Homs, Homs Governorate	Main article: 2018 missile strikes against Syria The U.S., U.K., and France struck a chemical weapons research center and a chemical weapons storage facility in response to the Douma chemical attack.	
April 29, 2018	Near Deir ez-Zor city to the East of the Euphrates, Deir ez-Zor	Main article: Deir ez-Zor Governorate clashes (April 2018) The Syrian Army, along with what were believed to be Iranian-backed militias, captured villages east of the Euphrates river near the city of Deir ez-Zor that were under the control of Kurdish-led forces in a rare clash with the Syrian Democratic Forces. Later that same day, the territory was recaptured by U.S.-backed proxy forces in a counter-attack spearheaded by the YPG with help from U.S. coalition jets. U.S. coalition jets hit the attacking forces consisting of the Syrian Army and possibly Iranian militias, according to a Western diplomat and a source in the SDF.	
February 2, 2020	Khirbat Amo, Near Kamishli, al-Hasakah Governorate	US forces conducting a patrol near Qamishli encountered a checkpoint occupied by pro-Syrian regime forces, where they came under small arms fire from unknown individuals. In self-defense, coalition troops returned fire.	

=== Other attacks ===
Date	Location	Notes	Ref.
September 17, 2016	Near Deir ez-Zor airport, Deir ez-Zor	Main article: September 2016 Deir ez-Zor air raid The Deir ez-Zor air raid was a series of 37 U.S.-led Coalition airstrikes near the Deir ez-Zor Airport in eastern Syria on 17 September 2016 that killed between 50 and 60 Syrian Army soldiers and wounded 30 more. The United States said that the intended target was Islamic State of Iraq and the Levant militants and that the attack on Syrian soldiers was due to a misidentification of ground forces while the Syrian and Russian governments claimed that it was an intentional attack against Syrian troops. The attack prompted Russia to call an emergency United Nations Security Council meeting. Later, the Syrian government called off a ceasefire that had been the result of months of intense diplomatic efforts by the U.S. and Russian governments.	
