= SSRC =

SSRC may refer to:

- Social Science Research Center (MSU), a research institution at Mississippi State University
- Social Science Research Council, an independent research organization based in New York City
- Social Science Research Council, former name of the Economic and Social Research Council, one of the United Kingdom's eight Research Councils
- Scientific Studies and Research Center in Damascus, Syria
- Synchronization source identifier, a header field in the Real-time Transport Protocol (RTP)
- Scottish Squash Rackets Club, based at 10 Malloch Street, Maryhill, Glasgow G20 8TP, Scotland
