= Syrian Scientific Studies and Research Center =

Syrian government agency

Centre d'études et de recherches scientifiques
- مركز الدراسات والبحوث العلمية

Agency overview
- Formed: 1971; 55 years ago
- Jurisdiction: Government of Syria
- Headquarters: Jamraya, Rif Dimashq, Syria; 33.3434°N 36.1405°E
- Employees: 20,000 (2020)
- Parent department: Ministry of Defense
- Child agency: Higher Institute of Applied Sciences and Technology

The Centre d'études et de recherches scientifiques (CERS) (Arabic: مركز الدراسات والبحوث العلمية markaz aldirasat walbuhuth aleilmia) is a Syrian government agency that has the goal of advancing and coordinating scientific and military research activities in the country. It works on research and development for the economic and social development of Syria, especially the computerization of government agencies. It is considered to have better technical capacity and equipment than the Syrian universities. Jane's Information Group Intelligence Services and other analysts believe it is responsible for research and development of nuclear, biological, chemical and missile technology and weapons, including ballistic missiles, as well as advanced conventional arms.

CERS is run by a director-general with the rank of minister, who is directly responsible to the president. From 1999 until 2021 it was headed by Dr. Amr Armanazi. It provides most research and development functions for the Syrian military. Since the 1970s, CERS has also been responsible for the development of civilian science and technology in Syria, and it was on this basis that CERS was able to develop cooperative relationships with Western chemical companies.

== History ==
SSRC was established in 1971, following a presidential directive of Nureddin al-Atassi from 1969. Its first director-general was Abdullah Watiq Shahid, a nuclear physicist who had become the minister of higher education in 1967. SSRC was ostensibly a civilian agency but Shahid's aim was to pursue weapons development. In 1973, President Hafez al-Assad authorized relations between SSRC and the Syrian Army. SSRC then became the main agency for development and enhancement of weapons for the army. While it remained ostensibly civilian, Ziauddin Sardar's 1982 book Science and Technology in the Middle East said SSRC "belongs to the Syrian defense ministry, and conducts military research."

In 1983 the military chief of staff was made responsible for appointing members of SSRC's board and technical staff. The military was also to authorize all appointments in SSRC's new branch for applied science, the Higher Institute of Applied Sciences and Technology (HIAST). The SSRC director-general was raised to ministerial rank. The production of chemical weapons became one of SSRC's main projects. News media have reported production plants for sarin, VX, and mustard gas near Damascus, Hama, Homs, Aleppo, and Latakia. Some or all of the plants were established ostensibly as civilian facilities. The highly secretive military facility in Jamraya was established in the 1980s, when Syria was a Soviet ally.

Western intelligence agencies believe that the Syrian procurement structure for biological and chemical weapons uses SSRC as cover. The center has received the required expertise, technology and materials from Russian sources to produce VX nerve gas.

In June 1996 the CIA had discovered that SSRC received a shipment of missile components from China Precision Machinery Import-Export Corporation as part as a wider collaboration between the two institutions. According to French intelligence, SSRC is responsible for producing toxic agents for use in war. A group named "Branch 450" is allegedly responsible for filling munitions with chemicals and maintaining security of the chemical agent stockpiles.

In 2005, US President George W. Bush issued Executive Order 13382, blocking the ownership and support of weapons of mass destruction, which prohibited United States citizens and residents from doing business with the SSRC. In 2007, the United States Department of the Treasury blocked 3 SSRC subsidiaries: The Institute of Applied Science and Technology (HIAST), the Electronics Institute, and the National Standards and Calibration Laboratory (NSCL).

In 2012, Iranian and North Korean officials and scientists were brought to bases and testing areas to aid in the development and use new types of weapons. In 2014, at the height of the Syrian civil war, CERS resumed the manufacture of long, medium range missiles and rockets at the same rate as before the war. In 2016, the head of Israeli Military Intelligence reported that Syria had resumed manufacture of the M-600 missiles, which has a range of 300 kilometers that was upgraded by CERS.

In June 2020, it was reported that SSRC has been seeking to procure illicit nuclear, biological, and chemical weapons of mass destruction technology in southern Germany. In one reported case, it procured laboratory equipment from a company in North Baden, which was to be forwarded to Syria via Lebanon and China.

In 2021, long-time director general Amr Armanazi and his deputy director Salam Tohme retired. Tohme was killed the same year.

== Organization ==
The CERS is divided into five research institutes and five centers. Research institutes pursue both project oriented and basic scientific research.

=== Structure (as of 2023) ===
- CERS Headquarters
- Advisory Committee to the Director General
- Technology and Innovation Department
- Institute 1000 (electronic warfare, missile guidance)
- Institute 2000 (mechanics)
  - Branch 410 (bombs, launchers and vehicles)
- Institute 3000/6000 (chemistry and biology)
  - Branch 450 (chemical components)
- Institute 4000 (missiles and aeronautics)
  - Department 4 (SSM development)
  - Project 99 (SRBM, MRBM production)
    - Project 991 (Scud development)
    - Projects 992–995, 997 (Scud production)
  - Project 702 (solid fuel engines, liquid fuel engines and rocket propellant)
  - Branch 340 (research and development)
    - Project 111 (SAM)
    - Project 504 (small diameter bombs)
    - Project 794 (weapon systems)
    - Project 797 (warheads, bombs)
  - Branch 350 (SSM and MLRS production)
    - Project M600 (M-600)
    - Project 602 (M-220, M-302)
  - Branch 650 (UAV technologies)
- Branch 550 (purchase and planning)
- Institute 5200 (researchers/engineers training)

=== Locations ===
CERS facilities are located in Jamraya (Institute 1000, Institute 3000, Branch 450, Branch 550), Barzeh (Institute 2000, Institute 5200) and Masyaf (Institute 4000). Also, Institute 4000 has centers in al-Rashideen, Aleppo (Branch 340), As-Safira (Project 504, Project 702, Branch 350) and Taqsis (Project 99).

In 2014, it was revealed that CERS together with Hezbollah established a base in Qusayr, Homs with underground facilities that allegedly store Shahab-1 missiles, delivered to the organization by the IRGC, and natural uranium. According to IAEA research, Syria possesses up to 50 tons of natural uranium. Suspected nuclear storage facilities were also in Marj al-Sultan. CERS also had bunkers and storage facilities at the Him Shanshar military installation. In June 2017, a new missile manufacturing facility of CERS was allegedly opened in Wadi Jahannam, Latakia.

By 2020, new ballistic missile production complex of CERS near the city of Baniyas was opened. The complex is similar to the Iranian military’s Parchin complex near Tehran. The Syrian government was actively working with Iran on its construction since 2017. There were also speculations about the production of Zolfaghar missiles, a version of the Fateh-110, which the new factory complexes in Baniyas could reasonably produce.

=== Linked civil and military institutes ===
- Higher Institute of Applied Sciences and Technology (HIAST)
- National Standards and Calibration Laboratory (NSCL)
- Établissement Industriel de la Défense (EID)
- Syrian Defense Laboratories (SDL)

== Research and development projects ==
=== Infantry weapons ===
- Type 58 / Type 68 Assault rifle
- Golan S-01 Anti-materiel rifle

=== Missile systems ===
- M-220 Artillery missile
- M-302 (Khaibar-1) MLRS
- S-11 Burkan MLRS
- Golan-65 MLRS
- Golan-250 MLRS
- Golan-300 MLRS
- Golan-400 MLRS
- Golan-1000 MLRS
- Falaq-1 (under license)
- Falaq-2 (under license)

=== Missile defense systems ===
- S-200 (modified)

=== Ballistic missiles ===
- Scud-B SRBM
- Scud-C SRBM
- Scud-D MRBM
- Scud-ER MRBM
- Golan-1 SRBM
- Golan-2 SRBM
- Maysaloun SRBM
- M-600 SRBM
- Fateh-313 SRBM
- Shahab-1 SRBM (under license)
- Shahab-2 SRBM (under license)
- Zelzal-1 SRBM (under license)
- Zelzal-2 SRBM (under license)
- Zelzal-3 SRBM (under license)
- Naze'at SRBM (upgraded with guidance system)

=== Bombs ===
- ODAB thermobaric bomb

=== Active protection systems ===
- Sarab-1 APS
- Sarab-2 APS
- Sarab-3 APS

=== Tanks ===
- T-72 Adra (Mahmia)
- T-72 Shafrah

=== Self-propelled field artillery ===
- 130 mm M-46 W-SPG

=== Logistics vehicles ===
- MAZ-6317 (under license)

=== UAVs ===
- Ababil-3 (under license)
- Qods Saeghe (under license)
- Various FPV drones

== Foreign cooperation ==
In 2022, it was reported that CERS has a wide-ranging cooperation with countries like Belarus, Russia, Iran, North Korea, China and Pakistan.

== Military activities ==
=== Development of chemical weapons ===
According to US intelligence reports, in August 2013, SSRC prepared chemical munitions used for deadly chemical attacks which killed hundreds of Syrian civilians in the Syrian Civil War.

According to French intelligence, SSRC is responsible for producing toxic agents for use in war, pinpointing "Branch 450" as being responsible for filling munitions with chemicals and also the security of sites where the chemical agents are stocked.

=== Sanctions ===
In 2005, US president George W. Bush issued Executive Order 13382, "Blocking Property of Weapons of Mass Destruction Proliferators and their Supporters," which prohibited U.S. citizens and residents from doing business with SSRC. In 2007 the US Treasury banned trade with three SSRC subsidiaries: the Higher Institute of Applied Science and Technology (HIAST), the Electronics Institute, and the National Standards and Calibration Laboratory (NSCL).

On 24 April 2017, weeks after the 2017 Khan Shaykhun chemical attack, the United States Department of the Treasury imposed sanctions on 271 SSRC employees for their alleged role in producing chemical weapons.

=== Military actions ===
In 2010, Nitzan Nuriel, the director of the Israel's Counter-Terrorism Bureau, said that SSRC had transferred weapons to Hamas and Hezbollah and that the international community should warn the Syrian government that SSRC would be demolished if it continued to arm terrorist organizations.

On 31 January 2013, one of SSRC's facilities, located at Jamraya, was damaged by an Israeli airstrike which was believed to be targeting a convoy carrying advanced anti-aircraft weaponry from SSRC to the Lebanese Shiite militia Hezbollah. In May 2013 Rif Dimashq airstrikes Israel hit another important shipment of SSMs to Lebanon.

In September 2017 the Israel Defense Forces bombed a SSRC military research facility near Masyaf, probably targeting an advanced missiles factory. Two Syrian soldiers were killed and the facility was severely damaged, with many weapons stored inside destroyed. Syrian media reported another Israeli attack in December 2017.

On 14 April 2018, several buildings alleged to be associated with the Syrian chemical weapons programme at SSRC's facility at Barzah in Damascus were destroyed during US missile strikes on chemical weapons sites. Other buildings within the larger complex were undamaged.

In August 2018, Dr. Aziz Azbar, the head of the SSRC Institute 4000 in Masyaf at that time, was assassinated in a car bombing, allegedly by Israel. He was reported to have been working on a medium and long range missile program. An Israeli airstrike on January 12, 2019 damaged a suspected Iranian target in a Syrian military base 1.5 km west of the research center.

On 29 February 2020, Turkish drone strikes bombed the SSRC site in As-Safira. A Turkish official claimed the site was used to develop chemical weapons.

On 24 December 2020, an Israeli airstrike near Masyaf destroyed four missile production facilities. The attack reportedly killed six people and destroyed depots and missile production facilities belonging to Iranian militias.

On 8 September 2024, Israeli airstrikes killed 5, injured 19 civilians and made some material damage in the Masyaf area, according to Syrian state news agency SANA. According to the Syrian Ministry of Defense, Israeli Air Force warplanes launched missiles off the Lebanese Akkar Governorate to the south-east towards Tartus, Baniyas, Hama and CERS facilities in Masyaf. The fighting was carried out in 3 missile waves and one drone wave and most of the hostile objects were shot down by the Syrian Air Defence Force.

== See also ==
- Syrian Civil War
- Barzah scientific research centre
- Him Shanshar military installation
- Syria and weapons of mass destruction
- Syria chemical weapons program
