= École de L'Aviation de Transport 319 Capitaine Jean Dartiques =

Transport Aviation School 319 Capitaine Jean Dartiques
- École de L'Aviation de Transport 319 Capitaine Jean Dartiques
- Country: France
- Branch: Armée de l'air et de l'espace
- Type: Trainer aircraft
- Role: Transport Aviation School
- Garrison/HQ: Avord Air Base

Aircraft flown
- Trainer: Embraer EMB 121 Xingu

École de L'Aviation de Transport 319 Capitaine Jean Dartiques is a French Air and Space Force (Armée de l'air et de l'espace) Transport Aviation School located at Avord Air Base, Cher, France which operates the Embraer EMB 121 Xingu.

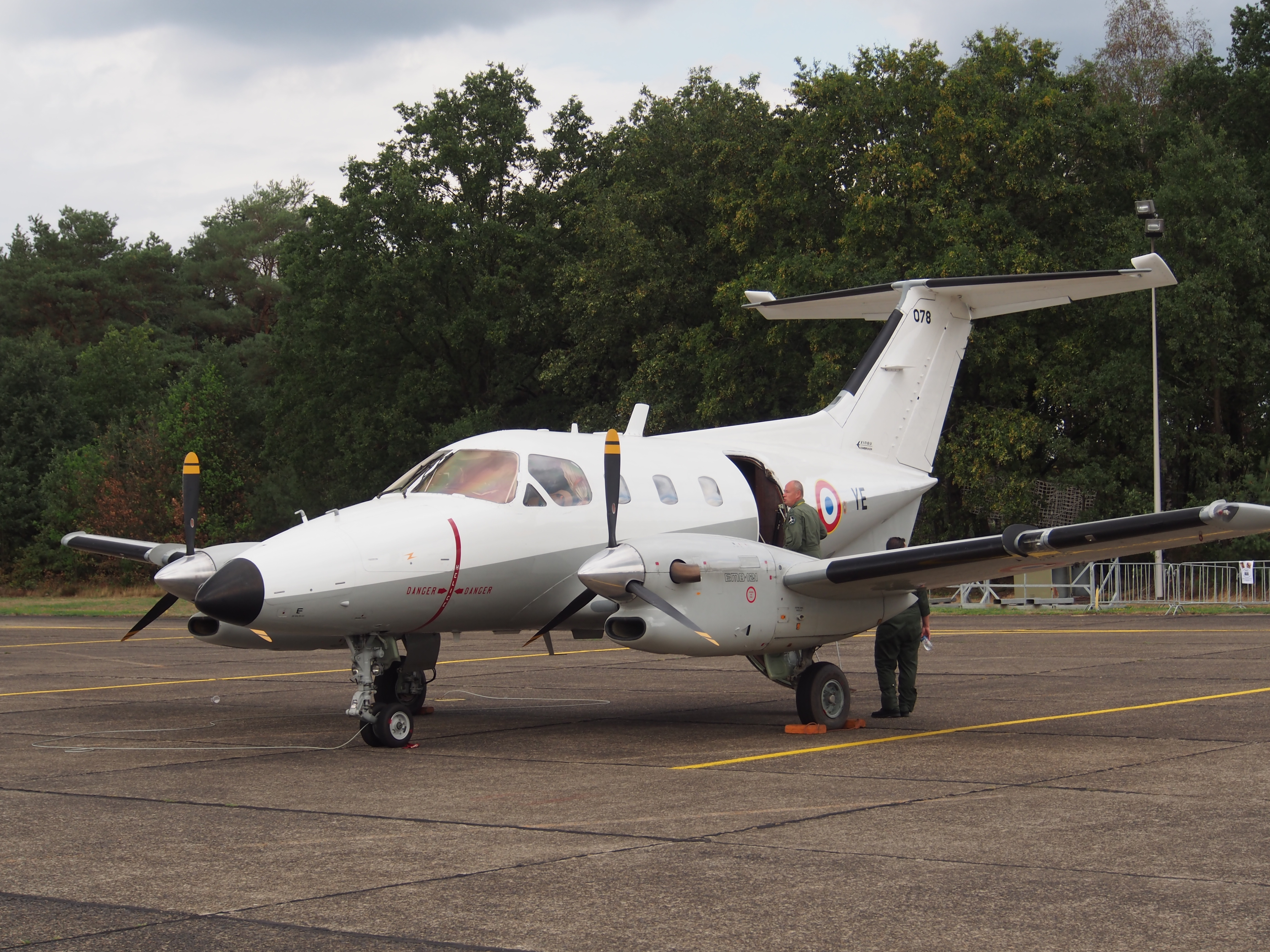
Embraer EMB121 Xingu

== See also ==
- List of French Air and Space Force aircraft squadrons
