= Barzah scientific research centre =

Building in Damascus, Syria

Coordinates: 33°33′30″N 36°18′56″E

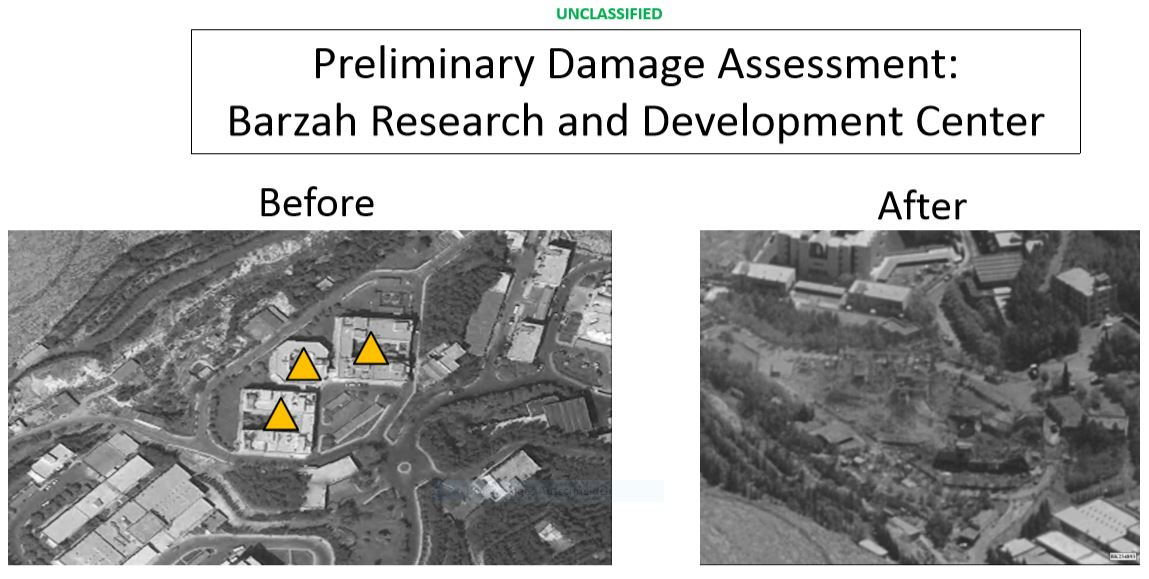
Barzah Research and Development Center

The Barzah scientific research centre, also known as the Barzah Scientific Research Facility or Institute 2000 was a facility of the Syrian Scientific Studies and Research Center (SSRC or CERS) located in Barzeh, Damascus. Several buildings at the centre alleged to be associated with a Syrian chemical weapons programme were destroyed during the April 2018 missile strikes against Syria during the Syrian civil war. Other buildings within the larger complex were undamaged.

In a press conference on April 13, 2018 US Defense Secretary Jim Mattis and Marine General Joseph Dunford claimed that this center is used for the research, development, production and testing of chemical and biological weaponry.

Previous reports by the Organisation for the Prohibition of Chemical Weapons stated that investigators from the organization inspected Barzah facility from 14 to 21 November 2017 and their report concluded that the analysis of samples taken during the inspections did not indicate the presence of prohibited chemicals in the samples. The inspection team did not observe activities inconsistent with obligations under the Chemical Weapons Convention during the second round of inspections at the Barzah facility. However, analysis of environmental samples collected by an inspection team that visited Barzah in November 2018 detected traces of a Schedule 2 chemical, a category of chemicals that are chemical weapons themselves or can be used to make chemical weapons. The UN asked the Syrian government for an explanation for the detection, but as of March 2023 Syria did not provide any technical information or explanations for the detection. Following the fall of the Assad regime, Israeli Air Force carried out air strikes on the facility.

== See also ==
- Him Shanshar military installation, also targeted during the 2018 bombing
