= Sarab Active Protection System =

Sarab Active Protection System سراب
- Type: Active protection system
- Place of origin: Syria

Service history
- In service: 2016–present
- Used by: Syria
- Wars: Syrian Civil War

Production history
- Designer: Syrian Scientific Studies and Research Center (CERS)
- Designed: 2015–2017
- Produced: 2016–present
- Variants: Sarab-1; Sarab-2; Sarab-3

Specifications
- Mass: 1100kg

The Sarab Active Protection System (Mirage) is an active protection system, developed by the Syrian Scientific Studies and Research Center (CERS) and designed to help the Syrian Army’s T-55, T-62, T-72 and T-72 Adra tanks counter line of sight anti-tank guided missiles (ATGMs).

== Design ==
Syrian intelligence acquired 18 Tube-launched, Optically tracked, Wire-guided (TOW) missiles from the Free Syrian Army; these missiles were used by the CERS to develop a countermeasure. The resulting soft-kill system incorporated powerful infrared (IR) jamming lights which were 80% effective against ATGMs. This has significantly reduced Syrian tank losses during the Syrian civil war.

Sarab can effectively jam SACLOS missiles such as the TOW (also TOW 2), HOT, MILAN, Dragon, 9K115-2 Metis-M, 9M113 Konkurs and Malyutka and laser guided weapons such as the Copperhead and some variants of the Maverick and Hellfire.

== Versions ==
As of 2017, the Sarab (Mirage) system has three versions:

- Sarab-1 was introduced in early 2016. Using multiple IR emitters mounted on a tank turret, it covers the 180° frontal arc of the tank and can operate for 6 hours.
- Sarab-2 entered service at the end of 2016. It includes a protective casing and uses less power, letting it operate continuously for up to 10 hours.
- Sarab-3 was introduced in 2017. Unlike the prior variants, it provides full 360 degree protection by using more IR emitters.

== Operators ==
- Syria – Syrian Armed Forces
