= Higher Institute of Applied Sciences and Technology (Damascus) =

Higher Institute

Higher Institute of Applied Sciences and Technology (HIAST)
- الْمَعْهَدُ الْعَالِي لِلْعُلُومِ التَّطْبِيقِيَّةِ وَالتِّكْنُولُوجِيَا
- Type: Public university
- Established: 1983
- Director: Mohammed Wael AlKhaled
- Location: Damascus and Aleppo, Syria
- Website: hiast.edu.sy/en

The Higher Institute of Applied Sciences and Technology (HIAST) (Arabic: الْمَعْهَدُ الْعَالِي لِلْعُلُومِ التَّطْبِيقِيَّةِ وَالتِّكْنُولُوجِيِّ, romanized: al-Maʿhad al-ʿĀlī li l-ʿUlūm at-Taṭbīqīyat wa t-Tiknūlūjī) is center of excellence for higher education, research & development in Damascus, Syria. It is linked to the Syrian Scientific Studies and Research Center.

== Background ==
HIAST was established in 1983 with the aim to qualify personnel to conduct scientific and technological research in all applied sciences and technology fields, so they can participate in the scientific and economic process in Syria. HIAST provides opportunities to make progress in applied research fields by joining courses to be awarded the degree of bachelor's degree, engineering diploma, master and doctorate.

HIAST is the academic interface for the military Syrian Scientific Studies and Research Center, but not a base for military research. According to the United States Department of the Treasury, the institution provides training to engineers associated with CERS with the Syrian program to develop weapons of mass destruction, as well as programs to develop its missile systems. For this reason, the United States government announced the imposition of sanctions on the institution.

HIAST extends the scientific applications which it conducts in cooperation with several public and private bodies in Syria, and also executes joint projects at the regional and international levels to transfer technology and exchange experience.

== Structure ==
=== Degrees Offered ===
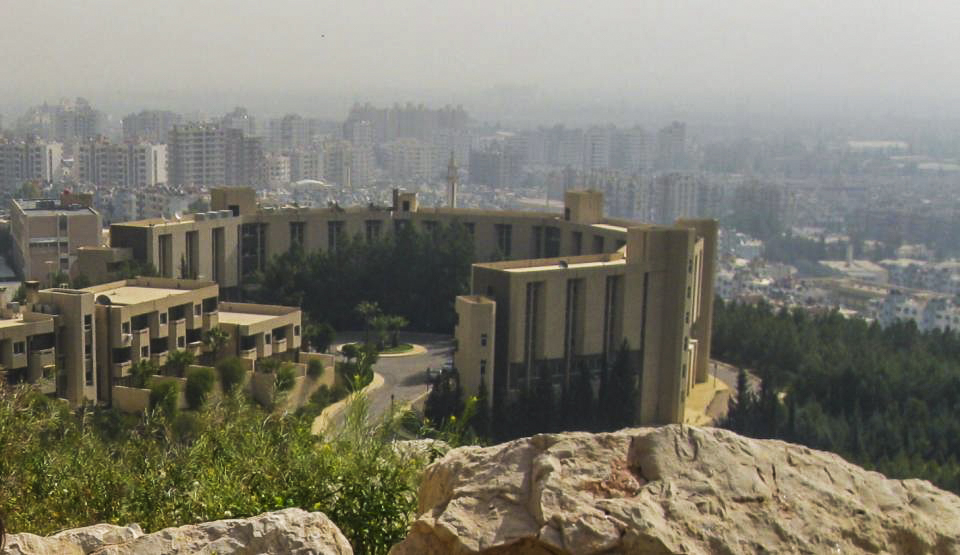
HIAST headquarters in Barzeh, Damascus

HIAST awards engineering diplomas (5 years undergraduate) in one of the following specialties:

- Telecommunications engineering
- Electronics engineering
- Mechatronic engineering
- Informatics engineering
- Materials engineering
- Aeronautical engineering

HIAST also offers seven masters programs (2 years postgraduate, “by-research” academic masters):

- Communication systems
- Robotics and Robot control
- Informatics and Decision support systems
- Big data systems
- Atomic, molecular, and optical physics and engineering
- Materials science and engineering

In addition, HIAST also awards PhD degrees in communications, informatics, control systems, materials science and engineering.

In addition to undergraduate and postgraduate programs at HIAST, continuous research and development activities are undertaken by HIAST engineers and researchers working in different departments, laboratories and technology centers. Some of these research and development activities are undertaken in collaboration with national and international universities, research centers and organizations.

=== Faculties ===
- Telecommunications engineering
- Electronic Systems engineering
- Informatics engineering
- Mechatronics engineering
- Materials science engineering
- Aeronautical engineering (Aleppo Branch)

Its main campus is in the Hameesh area of the Barzeh municipality of Damascus, and a second location in Seif al-Dawla municipality of Aleppo.

== Ranking ==
HIAST was established in 1983 to be the top academic institute in Syria. It has been ranked as the top academic institution in Syria since its establishment except for few years.

In 2017, HIAST was ranked 1st in Syria and 4327th in world ranking.

== Notable alumni ==
- Emad Abdul-Ghani Sabouni - Minister of Communications and Technology (2007-2014)
