= T-72 Adra =

T-72 Adra/Mahmia تي -72 عدرا
- Type: Main battle tank
- Place of origin: Syria

Service history
- In service: 2014–present
- Used by: Syria
- Wars: Syrian Civil War

Production history
- Designer: Syrian Scientific Studies and Research Center (CERS)
- Designed: 2012–13
- Manufacturer: Adra Industrial City
- Produced: 2014–present
- No. built: Unknown

The T-72 Adra (Arabic: تي -72 عدرا) or 'Mahmia' is a Syrian tank. It is a domestic upgrade to the T-72M1 that features slat armor, spaced armor, and chains to provide 360 degree protection from RPGs.

== Background ==
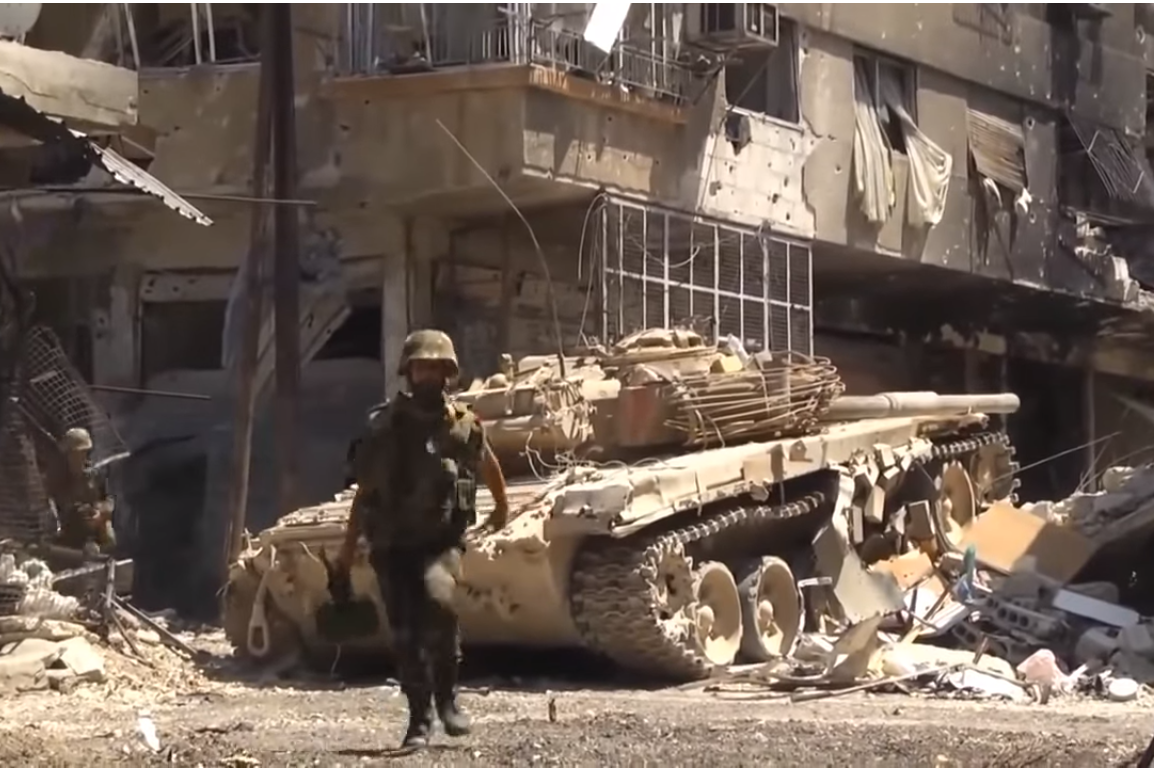
Syrian T-72AV tank in 2015. Similar tanks were upgraded to Adra variant.

In the late ‘70s through the early ‘90s Syria imported a number of T-72M1 tanks from the Soviet Union, as well as Czechoslovakia. These tanks were used in the 1982 Lebanon War, with moderate effectiveness, after which it was called by Hafez al-Assad, “The Best Tank in the World”. The Syrian Civil War took its toll on Syria's T-72 fleet, with many tanks being lost in intense urban combat. To try to reduce these losses, while under an arms embargo, Syria developed the 'Adra' upgrade for their T-72 tanks in the town of Adra.

== Design ==
The Adra consists of spaced armor around the turret and at the front of the hull, with the spaced armour and chassis being covered in a layer of slat armor. The turret ring is also protected by steel chains which hang from the turret and are weighed down with steel balls, in the hope that they will offer similar performance to slat armor, but with more flexibility, however these are rarely effective and usually do not detonate the projectile. Later versions are protected with Sarab Active Protection System against ATGMs.

== Operational history ==
The T-72 Adra was first deployed in Jobar in 2014, where two were confirmed to have been destroyed. As of November 2017 at least 11 T-72's have been converted to this variant. But it went on to be deployed in Eastern Ghouta, and possibly Aleppo. However, by 2016, it was in wide use in Jobar, Qaboun, and Eastern Ghouta, and very limited use in Aleppo. The T-72 Adra is often used in urban areas where regular T-72's would be vulnerable. It eventually proved to be vulnerable to rebel M79 Osa and RPG-29 anti-tank launchers and was later deployed in Daraa, though they have on 2 occasion stopped RPG-29's and usually stop early model ATGM's and RPG-7's in 2017, to stop the rebel offensive in Al-Manshiyah by the 4th Armoured Division of the Syrian Arab Army (SAA). 4th Division convoy towards Daraa included at least 4 tanks, 2 BMPs and 1 BREM-1 (+ several IRAM launchers).

== Operators ==
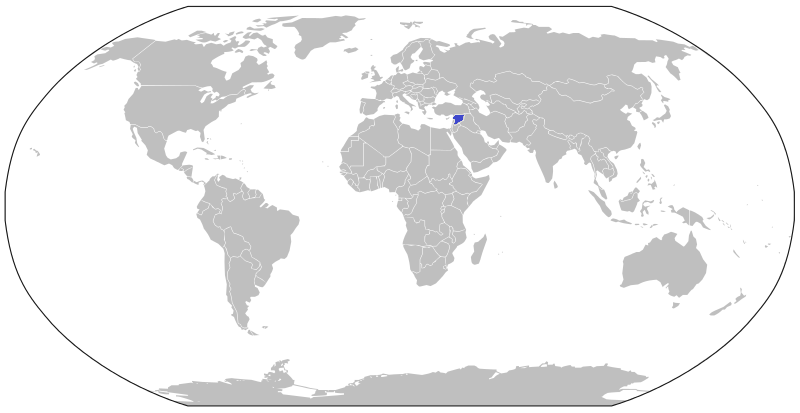
T-72 "Adra" operators in blue.

=== Current operators ===
- Syria – Syrian Armed Forces

== See also ==
- T-72 operators and variants
- Armored warfare
- Asymmetrical warfare
- Improvised fighting vehicle
- Vehicle armor
