= Dummar =

Dummar دُمَّر
- Municipality
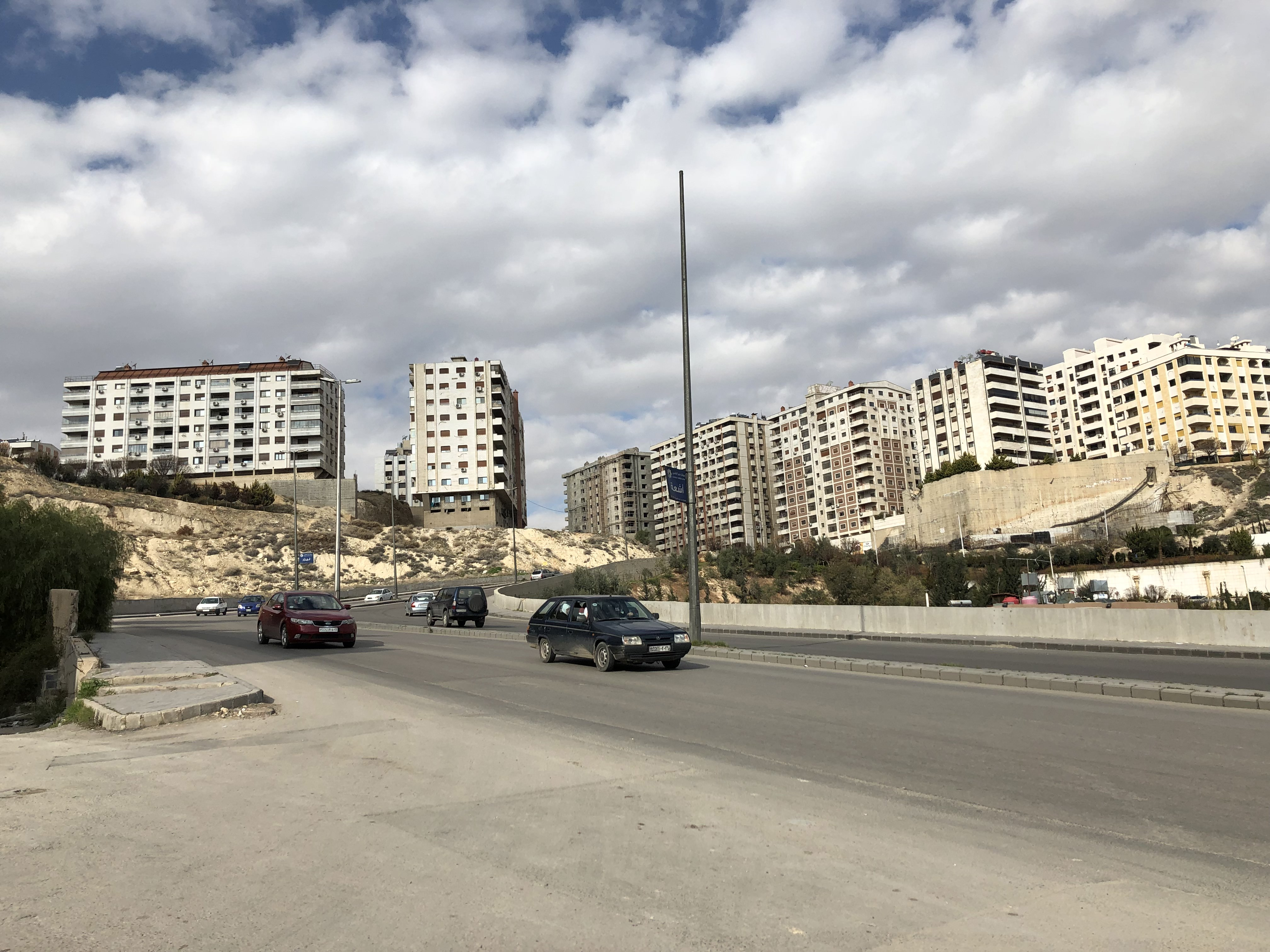
- Residential homes in Dummar

- Coordinates: 33°53′00″N 36°23′20″E
- Country: Syria
- Governorate: Damascus Governorate
- City: Damascus

Population (2004)
  - Total: 96,962
- Time zone: UTC+3 (EET)
  - Summer (DST): UTC+2 (EEST)
- Climate: BSk

Dummar (Arabic: دُمَّر, romanized: Dummar) is a municipal district of Damascus, Syria, located in the northwest of the city. It is the largest district of Damascus in terms of area.

== History ==
The construction of the district was launched in the 1970s, with the first residents moved in during mid-1980s. Today it is a largely middle-class suburb home to many Damascene professionals.

The municipality includes the Kurdish neighborhood of Wadi al-Mashari (Arabic: وادي المشاريع, Kurdish: Zorava, meaning Valley Projects)

Since the beginning of the Syrian Civil War, it was largely known as the safest area of Damascus, and was the site of a charity marathon for children with cancer.

== Neighborhoods ==
- Al-Arin (pop. 14,285)
- Dahiyet Dummar (pop. 18,739)
- Dummar al-Gharbiyah (pop. 30,031)
- Dummar al-Sharqiyah (pop. 19,739)
- Al-Wuroud (pop. 14,167)
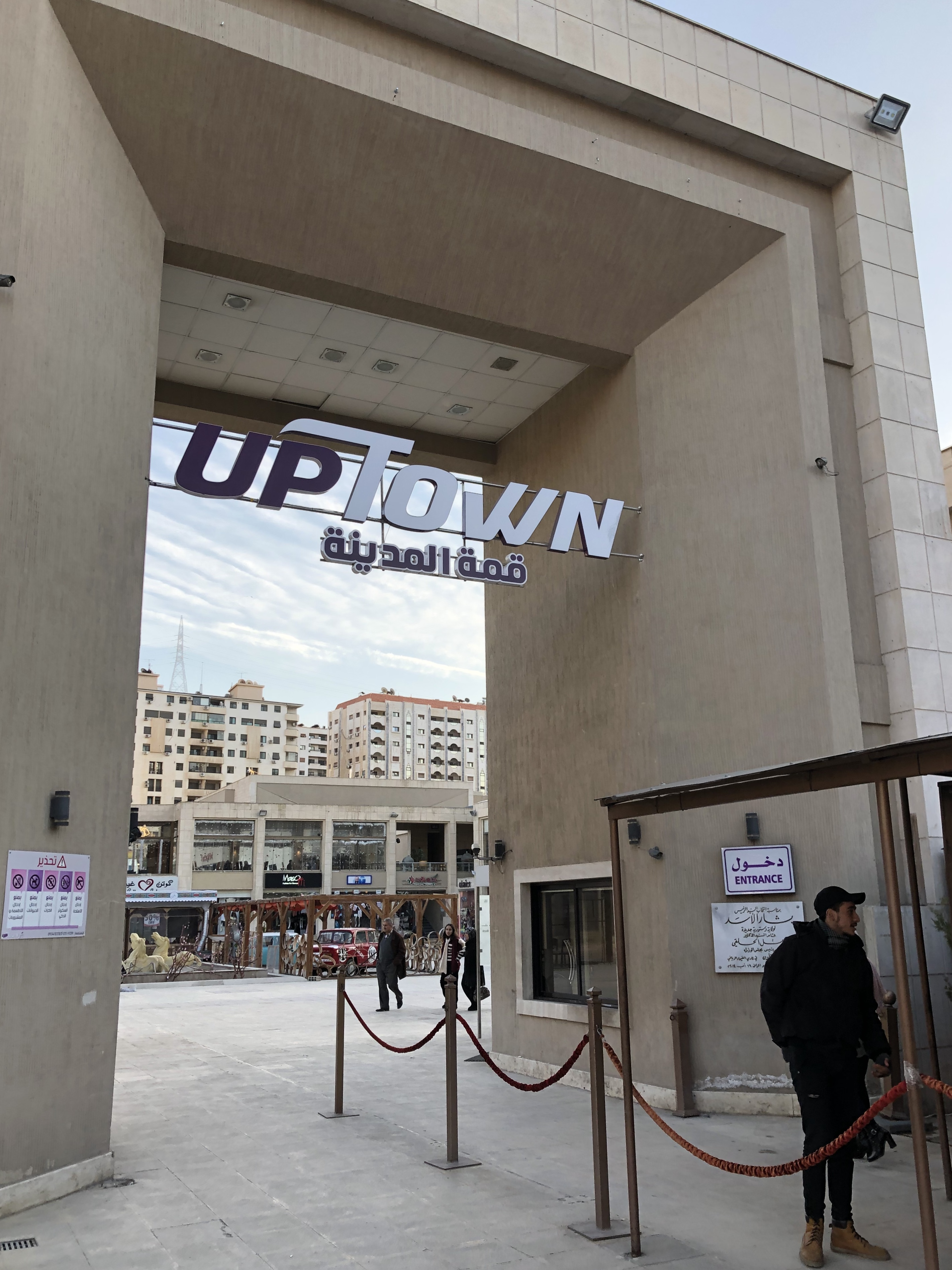
Uptown Outdoor Mall in Dummar

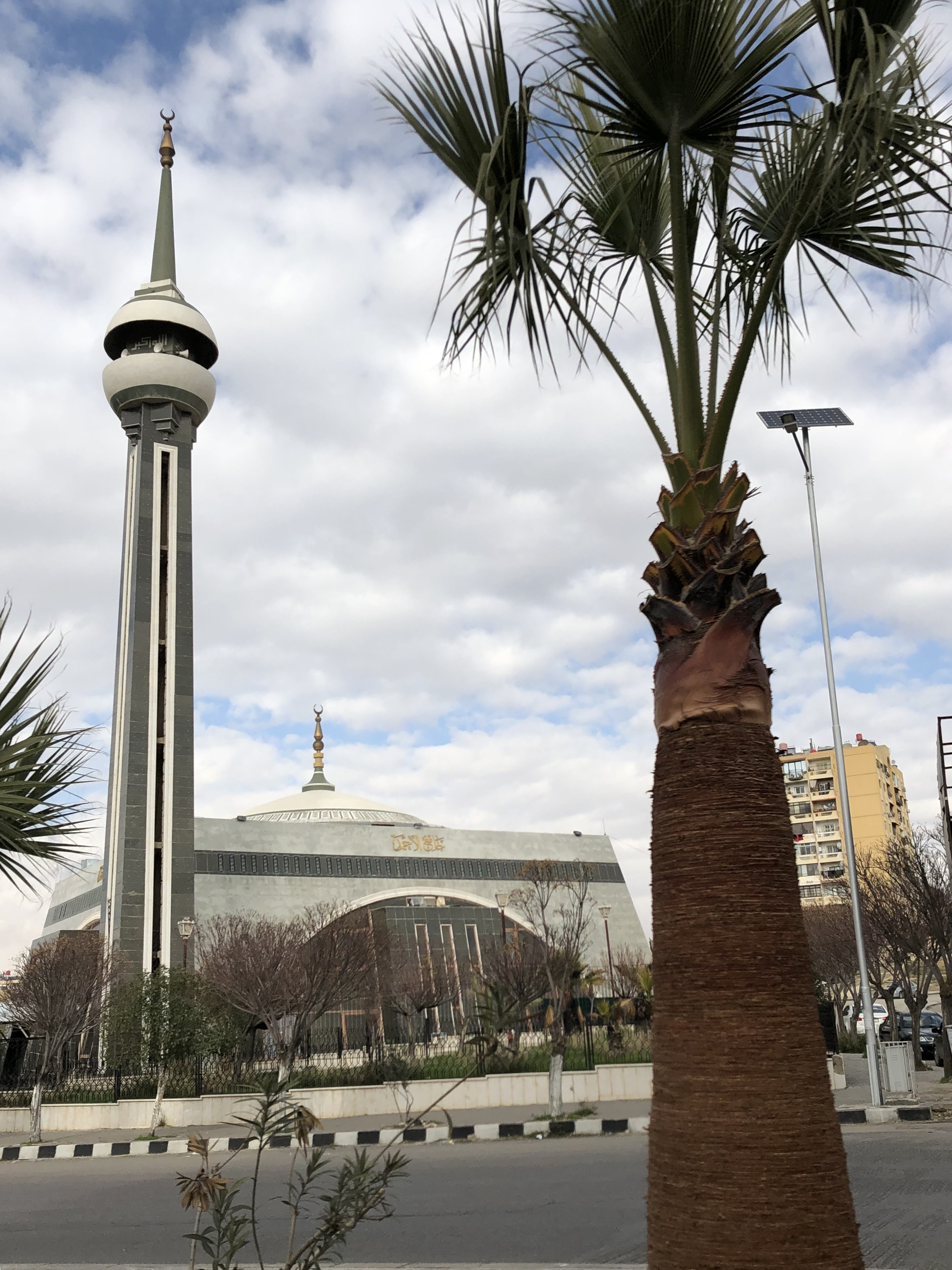
Mosque in Dummar

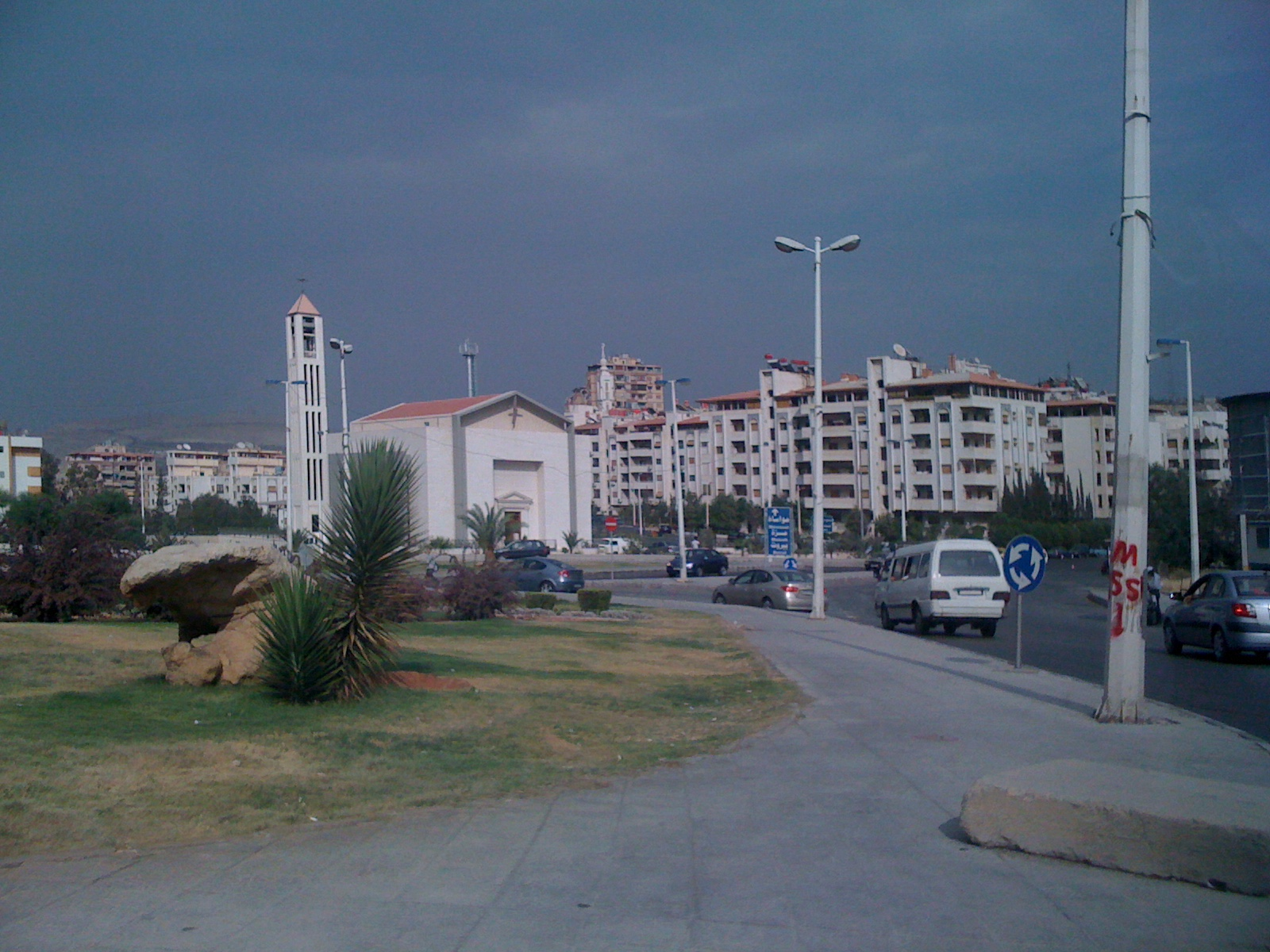
Dummar Church

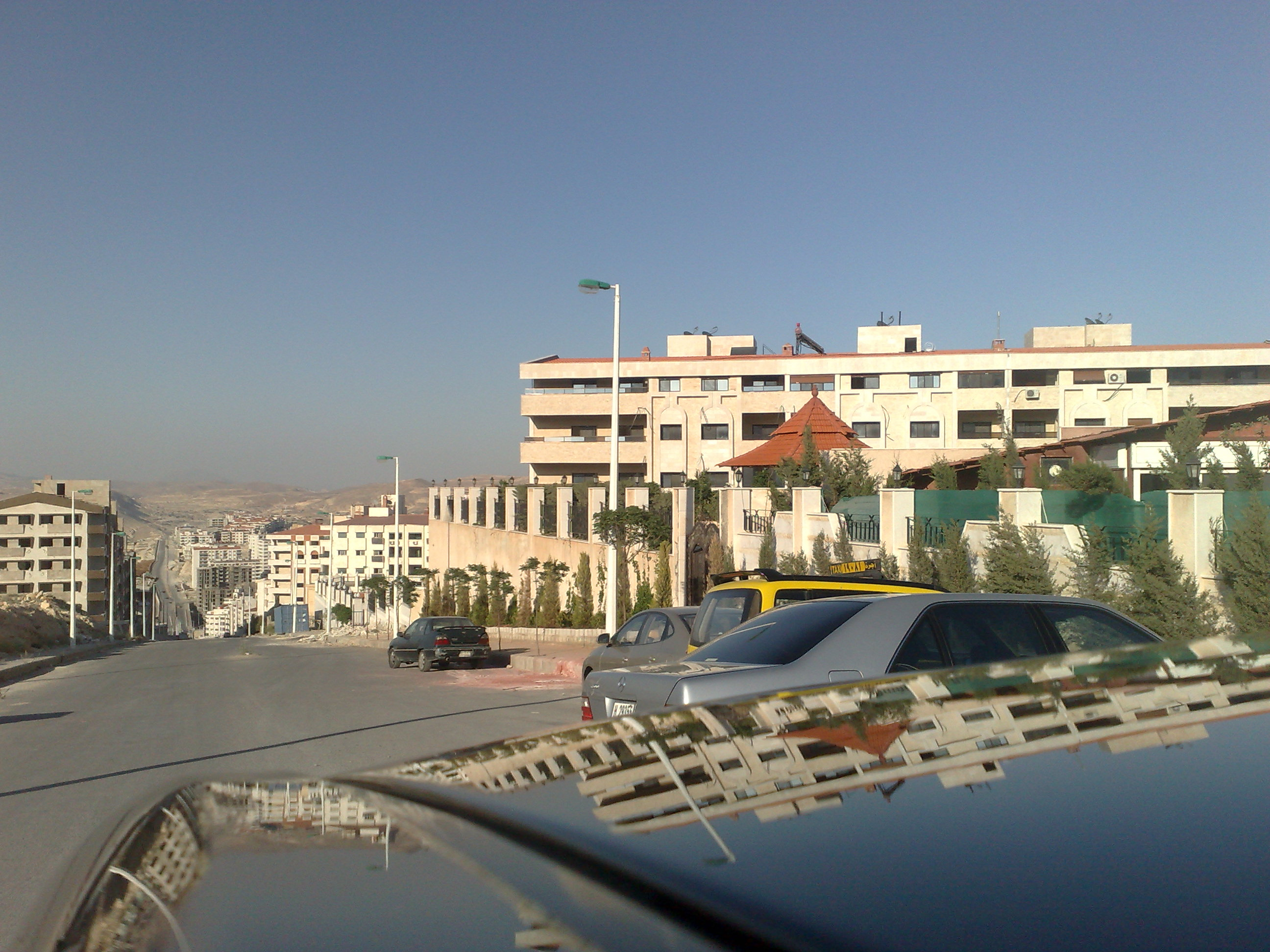
A street in Dummar
