= Escadron de détection et de contrôle aéroportés 36 Berry =

Airborne Detection and Control Squadron 36 Berry
- Escadron de détection et de contrôle aéroportés 36 Berry
- Country: France
- Branch: Armée de l'air et de l'espace
- Type: Surveillance aircraft
- Role: Airborne early warning and control
- Garrison/HQ: BA 702 Avord Air Base

Aircraft flown
- Electronic warfare: Boeing E-3F Sentry

Escadron de détection et de contrôle aéroportés 36 Berry is a French Air and Space Force (Armée de l'air et de l'espace) Airborne Detection and Control Squadron located at BA 702 Avord Air Base, Cher, France which operates the Boeing E-3F Sentry.

During March 2017 the unit took part in Exercise Real Thaw 2017 in Portugal.

== See also ==
- List of French Air and Space Force aircraft squadrons
