= Avord Air Base =

Avord Air Base (BA 702) Base Aérienne 702 Capitaine Georges Madon

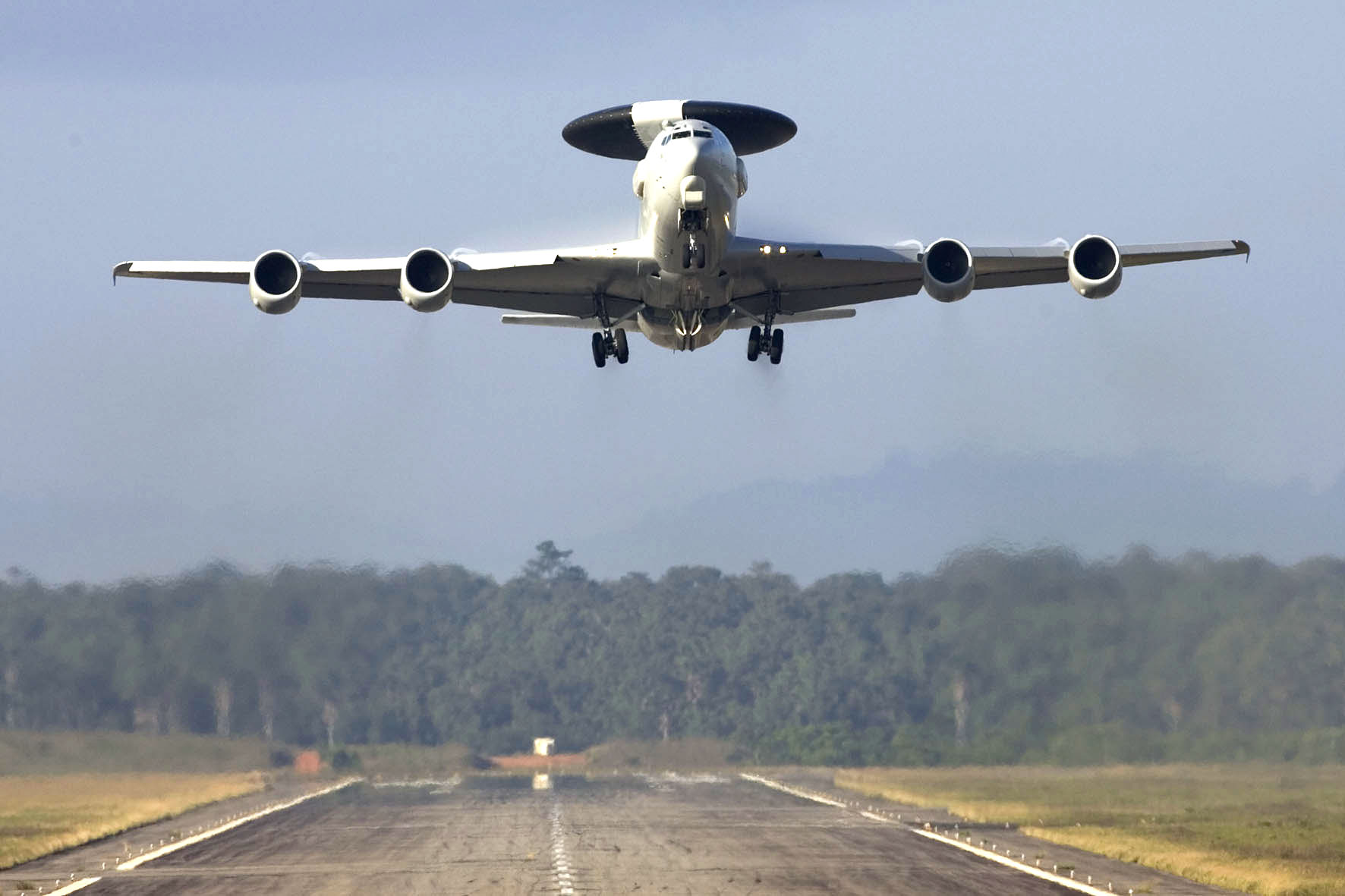
- E-3 Sentry taking off from Avord Air Base
- IATA: none; ICAO: LFOA

Summary
- Airport type: Military
- Owner: Government of France
- Operator: Armée de l'air et de l'espace
- Location: Avord, France
- Elevation AMSL: 580 ft / 177 m
- Coordinates: 47°03′12″N 002°37′57″E

Map
- Location of airport in France

Runways
Direction	Length		Surface
Direction	m	ft	Surface
06/24	3,503	11,493	Asphalt
- Source: Aerodrome chart at Direction de la Circulation Aerienne Militaire (DIRCAM)

Avord Air Base (ICAO: LFOA) or BA 702 (French: Base Aérienne 702 Capitaine Georges Madon), named after Captain Georges Madon, is a base of the French Air and Space Force (Armée de l'air et de l'espace) located 2.8 km (1.7 mi) north northwest of Avord in central France.

Airbase 702 hosts about 2,500 personnel (French Air and Space Force military and some civilian). Because of its strategic location in the middle of France it is extremely suitable as a multi purpose base. It has a single runway 06/24, 3,503 m × 45 m (11,493 ft × 148 ft).

== Units on the base ==
- Escadron de détection et de contrôle aéroportés 36 Berry which flies the Boeing E-3F
  - Its role is to carry out airborne surveillance, and command, control and communications (C3) functions for both tactical and air defense forces. The French designation is E-3 SDA (Systeme de Detection Aeroporté). Additional units attached: mission support flight, training flight, technical flight support and logistic flight.
- École de L'Aviation de Transport 319 Capitaine Jean Dartiques flying the Embraer EMB 121 Xingu
- Escadron D'Instruction en Vol Fourchambault

The base perimeter contains some maximum-security zones with:

- A Special Ammunitions Storage (SAS) or dépôt atelier munitions spécialisées (DAMS). Storage of appx. 60 of FAF's stockpile of Air-Sol Moyenne Portée ASMP nuclear midrange air ground missiles.
- Two hardened alert facilities. One is hosting for Dassault Mirage 2000N combat aircraft, normally home based at Istres Air Base (BA 125) or at Luxeuil - Saint-Sauveur Air Base (BA 116). These planes are detached here on a rotating cycles to comply to the French nuclear deterrence mission. The other facility hosts E-3F airplanes and KC-135 tankers, normally home based at Istres, but detached to Avord AB to be used with some AWACS and strike missions.

Other support units:

- technical maintenance depot.
- entrepôt de munition de l'armée de l'air Savigny-en-Septaine, a conventional ammo storage unit.
- 1H.702 firefighting/rescue and nuclear decontamination unit.
- 12.802 strategic telecom unit.
- 02.950 air defense sqn (escadron de défense sol-air) Sancerre equipped with the Crotale and MBDA Mistral short range air defense systems.
- 1G.702 security squadron (escadron de protection) Fusiliers Commandos de l'Air responsible for security and base protection.
