= Egypt–Syria relations =

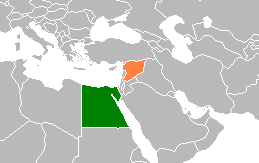
- Egypt: Syria

Egypt–Syria relations refers to the bilateral relations between the Arab Republic of Egypt and Syrian Arab Republic. Egypt has an embassy in Damascus. Syria has an embassy in Cairo. Both countries are members of the Arab League.

Relations were generally well under the reign of Hosni Mubarak, but were strained after the election of Muslim Brotherhood member Mohamed Morsi. Egypt closed down its embassy in Damascus in June 2013. However, relations were restored a month later, and the embassies in both countries were reopened at that time.

== History of relations ==
=== Pre-20th century ===
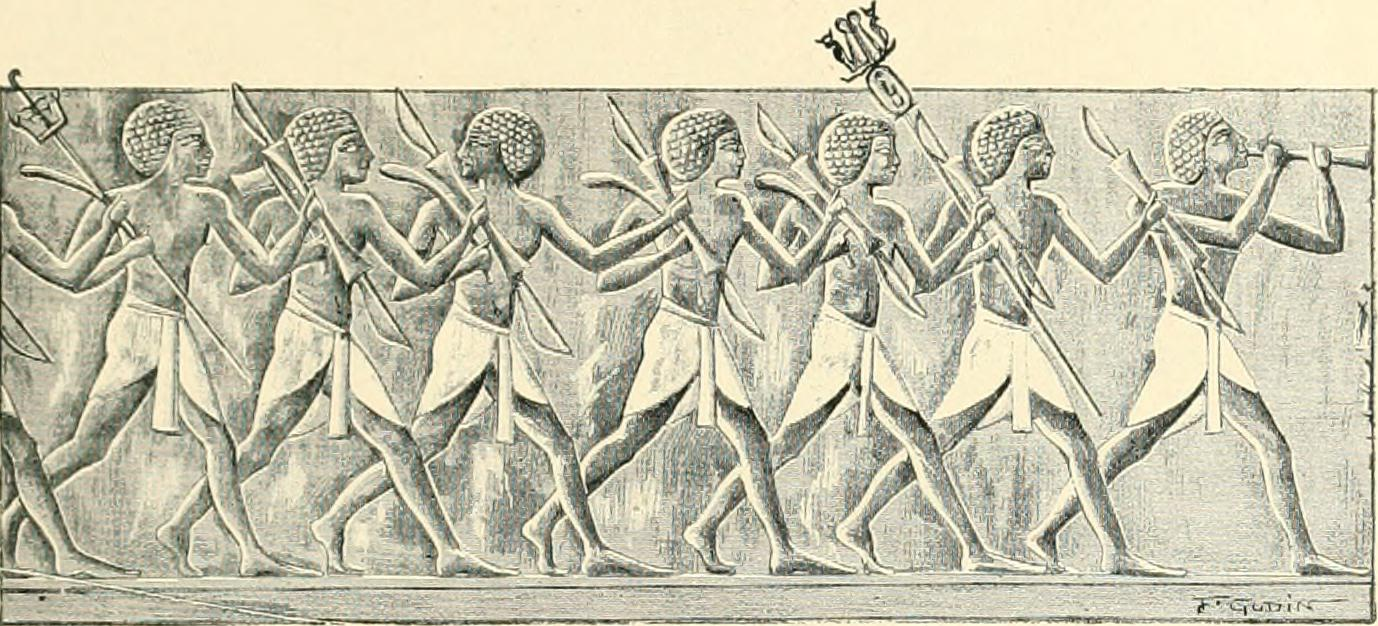
The struggle of the nations: Egypt, Syria and Assyria, 14th century BC.

During the New Kingdom of Ancient Egypt, the Nineteenth Dynasty of Egypt occupied parts of southern Syria and fought wars against the local Levantine groups. Eventually, Egypt would fall to the Assyrian Empire in 673 BC. Egypt and Syria would later be provinces of the Roman and Byzantine empires, before the Islamic conquests. Egypt and Syria would remain important lands of the early caliphates, such as the Rashidun, Umayyad, Abbasid, Fatimid, and Ottoman caliphate.

During the times of the Ottoman Empire, Napoleon invaded Egypt and Syria. After Napoleon was defeated, a power vacuum emerged in Egypt, and Ottoman general Muhammad Ali Pasha took control of Egypt and declared war on the Ottomans for control over Syria. Though he was successful, Syrian peasants revolted against Egyptian occupation. After the Second Egyptian-Ottoman war, Egypt withdrew from Syria in returned for recognition of Muhammad Ali's dynasty's rule over Egypt.

=== Relations before the 1958 merger ===
British influence in Egyptian affairs grew over time, so by 1914, Britain was able to replace the pro-Ottoman Khedive of Egypt Abbas II with the pro-British Hussein Kamel, who declared Egypt independent from the Ottomans and allied with the British, joining World War One against the Ottomans, with assistance from Syrian rebels. During the war, the British and the French colluded to divide Ottoman ruled Arab lands. Syria was agreed to become a French mandate, despite later conflict between French forces and Syrian rebels.

The Syrian and Egyptian governments post-WWI retained positive relations. Syria and Egypt were signers of the Alexandria Protocols and later founders of the Arab League. Both nations participated in the 1948 war against Israel, but would suffer a defeat to Israel. This defeat would leave shock-waves in Egyptian and Syrian politics, as well as Arab politics as a whole. The following year, three coups occurred in Syria: one in March by Husni al-Za'im, one in August by Sami al-Hinnawi, and a final one in December by Adib Shishakli. In 1952, the Egyptian monarchy was overthrown in a coup by a conspiracy of Egyptian officers, declaring the Egyptian Republic, with its first president Muhammad Naguib. That year, Shishakli founded the Arab Liberation Movement, a political party that espoused Pan-Arab nationalism. Shishakli meet with Naguib to discuss cooperation and a union between Syria and Egypt, which Naguib was receptive to but wanted to resolve the issue of Sudan, which Egypt had occupied since the conquests of Muhammad Ali, first. Talks between the Syrian and the Egyptian governments over unification continued even after Shishakli's overthrow in 1954 and Naguib's overthrow that same year by Gamal Abdel Nasser. The extent at which the 1952 Egyptian coup was inspired by the recent Syrian coups is not fully understood but highly speculated.

=== United Arab Republic ===
Pan-Arab sentiment was traditionally very strong in Syria, and Nasser was a popular hero-figure throughout the Arab world following the Suez War of 1956. There was thus considerable popular support in Syria for union with Nasser's Egypt. The Arab Socialist Ba'ath Party was the leading advocate of such a union.

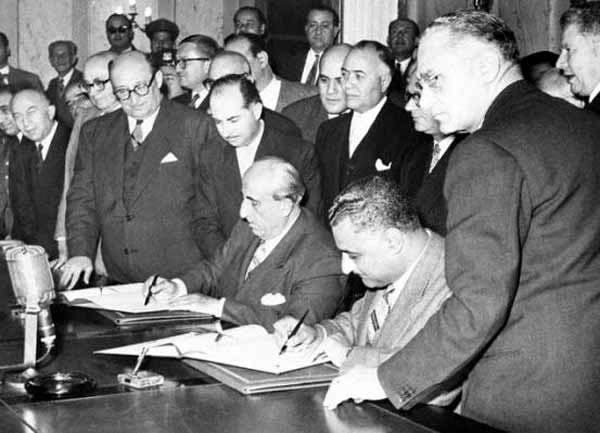
Nasser signing unity pact with Syrian president Shukri al-Quwatli, forming the United Arab Republic, February 1, 1958.

On 1 February 1958, a group of political and military leaders in Syria proposed a merger of the two states to Egyptian President Gamal Abdel Nasser. One of the major reasons for this union was worry over the growing influence of the Syrian Communist Party, under the leadership of Khalid Bakdash.

Thus, on 22 February 1958, the United Arab Republic was formed, uniting Syria and Egypt as one nation. Under this union, all parties in Syria were banned, and a massive crackdown on both Syrian communists and Syrian political life as a whole commenced. Syrian elites felt sidelined over perceived Egyptian domination of Syrian, affairs, with Egyptian filling out top Syrian political positions. However, the Egyptian government argued that strict management of Syrian affairs was necessary due to Syrian political chaos. By 1961, Syria was centralized into one province, and Nasser sent his vice president, Abdel Hakim Amer, to be the governor of Syria. This caused a crisis with Abdel Hamid al-Sarraj, one of the last Syrians to hold power in the UAR, resigning as a result. This incident lead many Syrian leaders to believe that Syria was being turned into an Egyptian colony, so a coup d'état in Syria in 1961 arrested Amer, sent him back to Egypt, and declared Syria an independent nation, though Egypt would keep the name 'United Arab Republic' until 1971. In 1963, a Ba'athist coup in Syria overthrew the Syrian government and talks between Egypt and Syria over unification returned, with Syria signing the Cairo Charter, promising an eventual union with Egypt. However, the Ba'athist government in Syria was more concerned over consolidating its rule than speedy unification and fears of a return to Egyptian domination caused Syria to back out of the Cairo Charter. In July 1963, a coup attempt took place in Syria, orchestrated by Nasserist officers with the support of Egyptian intelligence. It failed, and afterward, relations between the countries deteriorated significantly.

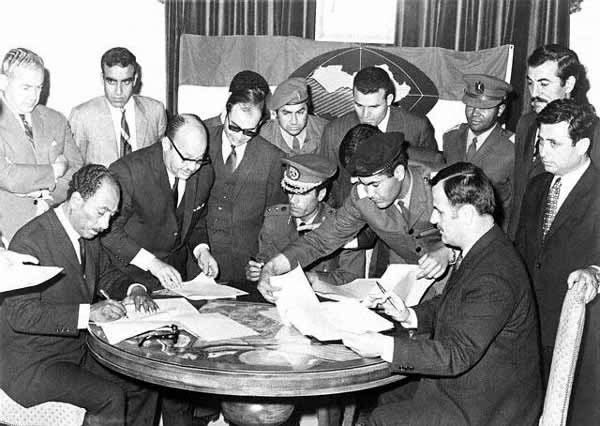
Syria's President Hafez al-Assad (sitting on the right side) signing the Federation of Arab Republics in Benghazi, Libya, on April 18, 1971, with President Anwar al-Sadat (sitting left) of Egypt and Leader Muammar Gaddafi of Libya (sitting in the centre). The agreement never materialized into a federal union between the three Arab states.

Syria stood by Egypt during the Six-Day War of 1967, which resulted in Egypt losing the Sinai Peninsula and Syria losing the Golan Heights to Israel. After the war, the new Syrian president Hafez al-Assad and Egyptian President Anwar Sadat agreed on a Federation of Arab Republics, a loose organization of political and military unity.

=== October War ===
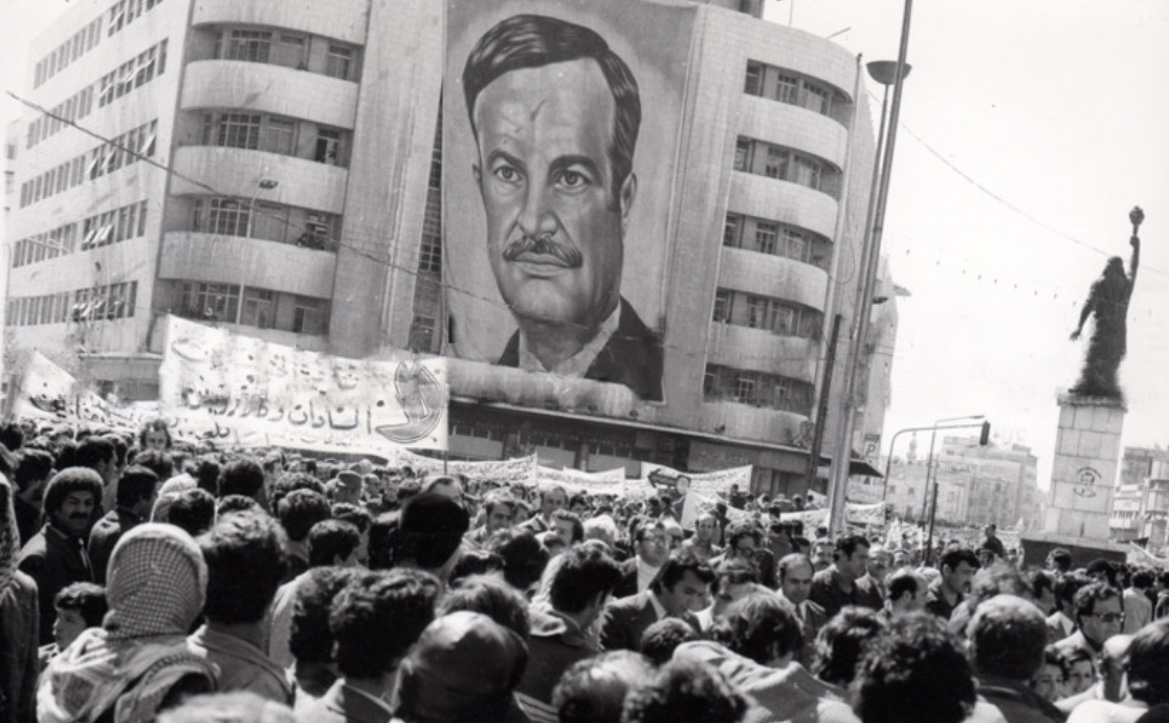
Anti Camp-David agreement demonstration in Damascus, 1978.

In 1973, Egypt and Syria launched the October War on Israel with a coordinated attack to retake the Sinai Peninsula and the Golan Heights. The 2-week-long war ended with Egypt regaining the east bank of the Suez Canal in Sinai but Syria losing even more territory to Israel, leaving the Israeli army threatening to capture Damascus. After the war, Sadat embarked on a pro-capitalist economic policy, a pro-US foreign policy, and eventual peace treaty with Israel, which contrasted with Syria's pro-USSR foreign policy, socialist economic policy and hard-line stance on the Palestinian cause. After Egyptian president Anwar al-Sadat's peace treaty with Israel in the Camp David Accords, Egypt was expelled from the Arab League. Syria severed diplomatic relations after Sadat's visit to Jerusalem. Relations between Egypt and Syria remained cold for the rest of Sadat's term, especially during Israel's and Syria's proxy conflict in Lebanon.

=== Under Hosni Mubarak ===
After Sadat's assassination in 1981, Hosni Mubarak became president of Egypt. Mubarak tried to balance Egypt's relations with the Arab World with Egypt's relationship with the United States and Israel. Egypt would support Iraq during the Iran-Iraq War, while Syria supported Iran. Egyptian-Syrian relations remained cold until the Gulf War, when both Syria and Egypt sent troops to expel Iraq from Kuwait, furthering the normalization of relations with Syria. During the Palestinian-Israeli peace process, Hosni Mubarak acted as a mediator. By the 1990s, Syria and Egypt had established positive relations, with Mubarak attempting to resolve the Syrian-Israeli tensions, planning for the return of the Golan Heights to Syria if Syria normalized relations with Israel. Mubarak also cooled tensions between Syria and Turkey in the late 1990s.

=== Post-Revolution Egypt and Syria ===
==== 2011–2013 ====
After the Arab Spring and the rise of the Muslim Brotherhood, relations became extremely strained. The Muslim Brotherhood is a banned organization and its membership is a capital offense in Syria. Egypt severed all relations with the Syrian Arab Republic in 2013.

Under Egyptian President Mohamed Morsi, who was a member of the Muslim Brotherhood, Egypt supported the Syrian opposition and called on Assad to step down. On 15 June 2013, President Morsi ordered the closing of the Syrian Embassy in Cairo and called for a no-fly zone over Syria.

An estimated 70,000 and 100,000 Syrian refugees were living in the country under Morsi's rule and the government tried to support Syrian refugees by offering residency permits, assistance on finding employment, allowing Syrian refugee children to register in state schools, and access to other public services.

==== 2013–2024 ====
Diplomatic relations were restored, and the embassies reopened after Morsi was removed from office just weeks later in July 2013. In July 2013, the two countries agreed to reopen the Egyptian consulate in Damascus and the Syrian consulate in Cairo.

In late November 2016, some Arab media outlets reported that Egyptian pilots arrived in mid-November to Syria to help the Syrian government in its fight against the Islamic State and Al Nusra Front. This came after Egyptian President Abdel Fattah el-Sisi publicly stated that he supported the Syrian military in the civil war in Syria. However, several days later, Egypt denied it has a military presence in Syria. However, Egypt was still a vocal supporter for the Russia Intervention and supporter for Bashar al-Assad, the latter of which is alleged by the United States to have sent military aid to, which Egypt denies.

In November 2016, Sisi said that he supported the presidency of Bashar al-Assad in Syria for the sake of stability. He also said that his nation's priority is "supporting national armies", which he said included the Syrian Armed Forces. He also said regarding Egypt's stance in the conflict: "Our stance in Egypt is to respect the will of the Syrian people, and that a political solution to the Syrian crisis is the most suitable way, and to seriously deal with terrorist groups and disarm them,". Egypt's support for a political solution was reaffirmed in February 2017. Egypt's Foreign Ministry spokesperson, Ahmed Abu Zeid, said that Egyptian Foreign Minister Sameh Shoukry, "during his meeting with UN Special Envoy to Syria, Staffan de Mistura, on Saturday confirmed Egypt's rejection of any military intervention that would violate Syrian sovereignty and undermine opportunities of the standing political solutions.”

In a February 2017 article in Foreign Affairs, Oren Kessler, the Deputy Director for Research at the Foundation for Defense of Democracies, suggests there are three reasons for Sisi's pro-Assad position: Egypt's common enemies with Syria (ISIS and the Muslim Brotherhood); Egypt and Syria's shared opposition to the policies of President Erdoğan of Turkey; and Egypt's growing relations with Russia, a close ally of Syria.

Egypt has also expressed great interest in rebuilding postwar Syria, with many Egyptian companies and businessmen discussing investment opportunities in Syria as well as participation in the reconstruction effort. Tarik al-Nabrawi, president of Egypt's Engineers Syndicate said that 2018 will witness a “boom and influential role for Egyptian construction companies in Syria and to open the door for other companies — in the electricity, building material, steel, aluminum, ceramics and sanitary material fields among others — to work in the Syrian market and participate in rebuilding cities and facilities that the war has destroyed.”

On 25 February 2018, Syrian state news agency reported that an Egyptian delegation composed of "members of the Islamic and Arab Assembly for supporting Resistance and Future Pioneers Movement as well as a number of figures", including Jamal Zahran and Farouk Hassan, visited the Syrian consulate in Cairo to express solidarity with the Syrian government.

After the 2023 Turkey–Syria earthquake, Egyptian President Abdel Fattah el-Sisi called his Syrian counterpart for the first time to offer assistance.

On 27 February 2023, Egyptian Foreign Minister Sameh Shoukry arrived in Damascus and met with President Bashar al-Assad and express his country’s solidarity with Syria following the earthquake. The visit to Syria was the first by a high-level Egyptian official since the start of the US-backed war. On April 2, 2023, Syrian Foreign Minister Faisal Mekdad visited Cairo, the first since the Civil War, aimed at advancing and restoring diplomatic relations.

On 19 May 2023, on the sidelines of the 2023 Arab League Summit, the presidents of both countries met and held a conversation about bilateral relations. It was the first meeting between the heads of the two states since 2011.

==== 2024–present ====
During the 2024 fall of the Assad regime in Syria led by Hay'at Tahrir al-Sham, Rassd News Network reported that Egyptians took to the streets of the country en masse to celebrate the rebels' victory.

Egypt's foreign minister, Badr Abdelatty discussed his country's support for the Syrian people with his counterpart from the Syrian transitional government, Asaad Hassan al-Shaybani, on 31 December 2024. On 3 January 2025, Egypt imposed a global ban on Syrians entering the country, with exceptions for those holding temporary residency. On 5 March 2025, Syrian President Ahmed al-Sharaa visited Cairo and met Egyptian President Abdel Fattah el-Sisi. In January 2026, an Egyptian trade delegation met with President al-Sharaa in Damascus to discuss a partnership to restart stalled factories and rehabilitate Syrian infrastructure, with both sides emphasizing that such economic collaboration serves regional stability and shared interests.

== Economic ties ==
By 2021, Egypt's share of Syrian exports was 5.35%, making it Syria's reliable and fifth biggest export partner. In 2021, Egypt was one of the biggest import partners of Syria with a share of 6.56%.

== See also ==
- Foreign relations of Egypt
- Foreign relations of Syria
- United Arab Republic
- United Arab States
- Federation of Arab Republics

== Sources ==
Rathmell, Andrew (1998). "Brotherly enemies: The rise and fall of the Syrian‐Egyptian intelligence axis, 1954–1967". Intelligence and National Security. 13 (1): 230–253. doi:10.1080/02684529808432469.

Podeh, Elie (2003). "To unite or not to unite – that is not the question: The 1963 tripartite unity talks reassessed". Middle Eastern Studies. 39 (1): 150–185. doi:10.1080/00263200412331301627.
