= India–Syria relations =

- India: Syria

Diplomatic mission
- Embassy of India, Damascus: Embassy of Syria, New Delhi

Envoy
- Ambassador Dr. Irshad Ahmad: Ambassador Dr. Bassam Alkhatib

Bilateral relations between India and Syria are historic with the two countries having ancient civilisational ties. Both countries were on the Silk Road through which civilisational exchanges took place for centuries. India has an embassy in Damascus. Syria has an embassy in New Delhi. Both countries are members of Non-Aligned Movement.

== History ==
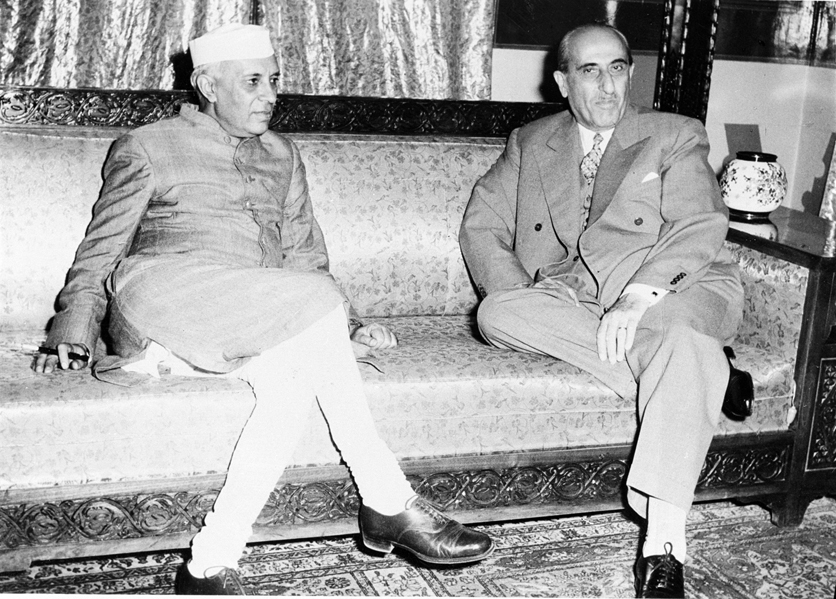
Prime Minister Jawaharlal Nehru and President Shukri Kuwatly in Damascus; 1956.

=== Ancient ===
Aramaic edict of King Ashoka mentions a trade route connecting India with mediterranean basin through city of Palmyra, Syria. Both countries were on the Silk Road through which civilizational exchanges took place for centuries. Syriac Christianity, originating in ancient Syria, spread further to the East and created the first Christian communities in ancient India. The ancient Syriac language among the Syrian Christians of Kerala was also brought to Kerala by Thomas the Apostle in the 1st century CE. The Syriac language continues to be taught in colleges, universities and Syrian churches in Kerala.

=== Modern ===
Both countries established diplomatic relations in May 1950. The urge to pursue relations with the Muslim world in general, and the Arab world in particular, was strengthened in light of the partition of India on religious grounds. Religious partitions aside. the same perspective brought support for the Palestinian cause. Additionally, India pursued a pro-Arab policy regarding the Arab-Israeli conflict in order to counteract Pakistani influence in the region as well as to secure access to Western Asian petroleum resources.

On 14 July 1957, Indian first Prime Minister Jawaharlal Nehru visited Damascus on his way to the United States. During the visit, a main street (where Umayyad Square is currently located) was named in his honour in order to "immortalise Syrian-Indian relations."

A common nationalism and secular orientation, membership of NAM and similar perceptions on many issues further strengthened a bond between the two states. India supported "Syria’s legitimate right to regain the occupied Golan Heights." In turn, this was reciprocated with Syrian recognition that Kashmir is a bilateral issue as well as general support of India's concerns and even candidature at various international forums.

The Indian Minister of State for Information & Broadcasting, Arun Jaitley, visited Syria in January 2000. A senior Minister, Murali Manohar Joshi participated in the funeral ceremonies of the former President Hafez al-Assad in June 2000. The Minister of State for Science and Technology, BS Rawat visited Syria in November 2000. Jaswant Singh also visited Syria in January/February 2001 and Yashwant Sinha visited Syria in August 2003.

Syrian Deputy PM & Foreign Minister Farouk Al-Shara visited India in August 2002. Indian Prime Minister Atal Bihari Vajpayee travelled with a delegation including his Minister of External Affairs, National Security Adviser and senior officials for a 3-day official visit to Syria, which was the first visit of an Indian prime minister after 15 years. On the trip Vajpayee and Assad jointly inaugurated the Syrian National Bio-technology Centre, that was established with Indian assistance, where Vajpayee announced a special grant of US$1 million for the centre. The two countries also decided to set up a Joint Hydrocarbon Committee. Vajpayee also announced a credit line of US$25 million for the development of bilateral trade. For their part, Syria also supported a resolution of India-Pakistan issues bilaterally through dialogue based on the Simla Agreement (1972) and the Lahore Declaration (1999), while Vajpayee reiterated India's "principled support for the Palestinian and Syrian causes and for the legitimate rights and aspirations in the framework of the UNSC Resolutions as well as the 'land for peace' principle." Later, the Syrian foreign minister did not visit India and was followed a year later by President al-Assad. After Al-Assad's son became president in July 2000, his first ministerial delegation that went abroad was to India, led by the then Deputy Prime Minister for Economic Affairs and included the Ministers of Planning, Industry, Science & Technology and Higher Education.

=== Developing relations ===
Beyond commercial ties, India and Syria also have professional exchanges. In addition to a large Syrian student population in India, each year five scholarships under the CEP programme are offered to Syrian students for pursuing higher studies in India, as well as 14 scholarships to Syrian scholars under the General Cultural Scholarship Scheme (GCSS). Syria also offers five scholarships to Indian students for studying Arabic language and literature. The two countries have also signed agreements to cooperate in scientific and technical education.

In 2007, Assad called on India to take a more active role in the Middle East peace process. The Syrian Foreign Minister also made a similar comment saying, "India must play its role in the international arena. The situation in the Middle East directly influences India. It is in India's interest to see a resolution of the Arab-Israeli conflict. India needs to invest in its relations with the US to convince the US administration that stability in the Middle East is in the interests of the US and Israel. India should also persuade other Non-Aligned Movement countries to back the peace process in the Middle East and the establishment of a Palestinian state. India can do a lot in this field. As long as India continues its independent foreign policy, relations between India and Syria will grow to mutual advantage." In 2008, then Indian President Pratibha Patil called on the two states to strengthen relations with increasing trade and encouraging people-to-people contacts. While hosting Syrian president Syrian President Bashar al-Assad she said that "Our civilisational and historical links are well known and well documented. We look forward to intensifying our relations with Syria as we believe that our historical links are just as important to our peoples as our common endeavours in the path of modernisation." In 2010, on a visit to Syria patil called on Israel to return the Golan Heights: ""India has consistently supported all just Arab causes. I would also like to reiterate our strong support for Syria's legitimate right to the Golan Heights and for its very early and full return to Syria." Syrian President Bashar al-Assad held a press conferenced with Patil where he lambasted Israel for obstructing peace and said: "We expressed our hope that Syrian-Indian relations together with international efforts will help put an end to the sufferings of the Palestinian people, blockaded by an apartheid wall."

== Commerce ==
Trade data
Year	Exports	Imports
1995-96	US$30 million	US$8.29 million
1996-97	US$48 million	US$21 million
1997-98	US$53 million	US$7.3 million
1998-99	US$60.76 million	US$17.89 million
1999-00	US$65.67 million	US$11.82 million
2000-01	US$72.91 million	US$6.5 million
2001-02	US$95.94 million	US$7.23 million
2002-03	US$122.02 million	US$8.9 million

In 2017, The Indian Foreign Ministry described the two countries' economic relations as having "bright prospects and harbour great potential."

Before the Syrian Civil War, Indian exports to Syria consisted primarily of man-made fabrics and yarns (21%), machinery and transport equipment (20%), pharmaceuticals & chemicals (8%), manufacture of metals (6%), jute and jute products (4%). Its imports consisted of rock phosphates, pulses, spices, raw cotton and raw wool however, more scope was seen for increasing exports of traditional items like jute/jute products, non-basmati rice, tea, coffee, and other agricultural goods.

In the first decade of the 21st century, India and Syria also announced areas of mutual benefit to focus more attention on: rock phosphates and fertilisers, cement, the power sector, information technology, education and agro-industries were such areas. India additionally expressed interest in expanding its industrial engagements in the form of investments and joint-ventures.

In 2009, Indian Petroleum Minister Murli Deora and Syrian Minister of Petroleum and Natural Resources Sufian Al-Alaw signed an agreement at the Petrotech India 2009 conference paving the way for ONGC Videsh, the foreign arm of the upstream Oil and Natural Gas Corporation, to explore for oil and natural gas in Syria. Until then most Indian investment in Syria had been on a small scale. In 2006, Syria received investments from India worth US$84 million out a total of US$800 million. India was, therefore, the third highest investor (behind Iran's lead) in the country and ahead of Germany's with US$24 million (while the EU as a whole put in US$155 million). At the time, the trade balance was in favour of India, though it was speculated that this could change with the new oil and gas contracts.

Many Indian companies have also for important contracts from Syria. KEC (I) Ltd completed a contract of around US$48 million for building electricity transmission towers/network for the Jordan-Syria sector. BEML is a regular supplier of earthmoving equipment to Syria and concluded an order of around US$6 million. IRCON got an order of around US$9 million for electric sub-stations. ABB (India) won a contract of around US$51.5 million to supply nine power sub-stations. The ONGC Videsh-led consortium was awarded an exploration contract (block 24, which is potentially rich in oil). The Indian Electrical & Electronics Manufacturers’ Association also for US$40 million worth of contracts.

== Cultural relations ==
The first Christian presence in India was that of the Church of the East. The ancient Syriac language among the Syrian Christians of Kerala was also brought to Kerala by St Thomas in the 1st century CE. Even today the language continues to be taught in colleges and universities in Kerala.

== Bilateral visits ==
Bilateral visits
Title	Name	Nationality	Year	Reason
President	Shukri al-Quwatli	Syrian	17 January 1957	State visit
Prime Minister	Jawaharlal Nehru	Indian	14 July 1957	State visit
Prime Minister	Jawaharlal Nehru	Indian	1960	State visit
President	Hafez al-Assad	Syrian	1978 & 1983	State visit
Vice-President	Zuhair Masharqa	Syrian	1991	
Foreign Minister	Farouk al-Sharaa	Syrian	1998	
Law Minister	Arun Jaitley	Indian	January 2000	
Human Resources Development Minister	Murali Manohar Joshi	Indian	June 2000	Funeral of Hafez al-Assad
Deputy Prime Minister	Khalid Raad	Syrian	July 2000	
Deputy Prime Minister & Foreign Minister	Farouk al-Sharaa	Syrian	August 2002	
Prime Minister	Atal Bihari Vajpayee	Indian	November 2003	State visit
Deputy Foreign Minister	Farukh Taha	Syrian	April 2006	
Industry Minister	Fuad Issa al-Jouni	Syrian	January 2007	CII Business Partnership Summit, Bengaluru
Minister of Petroleum	Murli Deora	Indian	April 2007	With MDs of major Public Sector Undertakings in the oil and gas sector on an exploratory bilateral visit (also first visit by a Cabinet Minister of an Indian economic ministry).0
Foreign Minister	Walid Muallem	Syrian	August 2007	State visit
Deputy Prime Minister	Abdullah Dardari	Syrian	January 2008	Ministerial and business delegation, including Ministers of Electricity, Higher Education and Planning to attend the 1st session of the Syria-India Joint Commission and the CII Partnership Summit, Gurgaon. Also visited the Auto Show (Delhi) unveiling the Tata Nano, the Delhi Metro, BHEL (Haridwar), Pune (to visit Tata Motors), IT and Bio-technology and other companies in Hyderabad, industrial and financial institutions in Mumbai.
President	Bashar al-Assad	Syrian	June 2008	State visit
Deputy Foreign Minister	Ahmed Arnous	Syrian	February 2010	Accompanied by the General Manager of the Syrian Investment Agency, Ahmad Abdul Aziz, visited Delhi to attend the 2nd Indo-Arab Investment Project Conclave
Commerce and Industry Minister	Anand Sharma	Indian	June 2010	Co-Chair the 2nd Session of the India-Syria Joint Commission
Deputy Foreign Minister	Faisal Mekdad	Syrian	July/August 2011	State visit
Political and Media adviser to Presidency	Bouthaina Shaaban	Syrian	March 2013	State visit
Joint Secretary	Sandeep Kumar	Indian	December 2013	Work visit
Joint Secretary	Sandeep Kumar	Indian	February 2015	Work visit
Deputy PM & Foreign Minister	Walid Muallem	Syrian	11-14 January 2016	State visit
Minister of State for External Affairs	M. J. Akbar	Indian	August 2016	State visit
Secretary (CPV & OIA)	Ausaf Sayeed	Indian	October 2022	Scholarships for Study in India programme
Foreign Minister	Faisal Mekdad	Syrian	17-22 November 2022	State visit
Joint Secretary	Sridharan Madhusudhanan	Indian	13 April 2023	State visit
Minister of State for External Affairs	V. Muraleedharan	Indian	12-14 July 2023	State visit

== Consular exchanges ==
VP Haran, the Joint Secretary at the Indian Ministry of External Affairs, was appointed as the Ambassador of India to the Syrian Arab Republic on 10 September 2008. Mr. Vijay Pandey, the Second Secretary at the Indian Ministry of External Affairs, was appointed as the Chargé d'affaires of India to the Syrian Arab Republic on 18 April 2023. On 15 November 2023, Dr. Irshad Ahmed was appointed as Ambassador Extraordinary and Plenipotentiary of India to the Syrian Arab Republic.

== See also ==
- Foreign relations of India
- Foreign relations of Syria
