= Him Shanshar military installation =

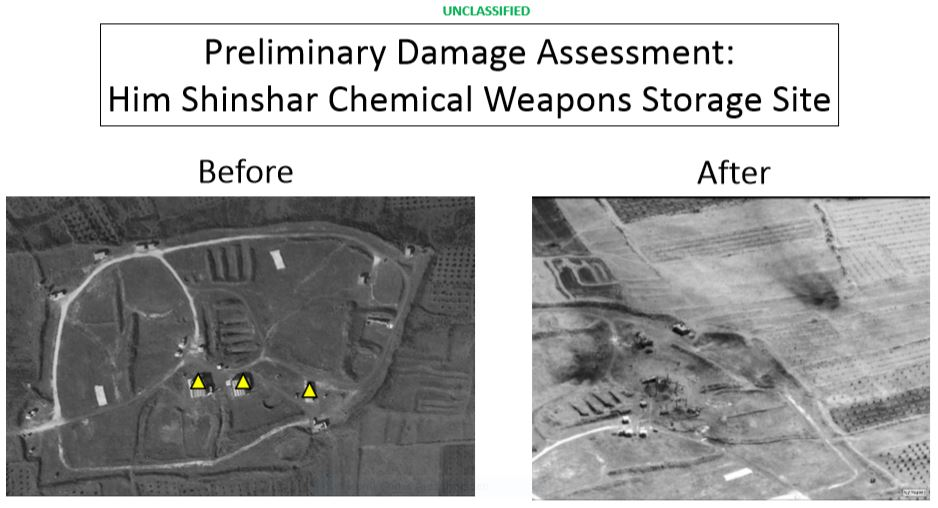
Storage facility

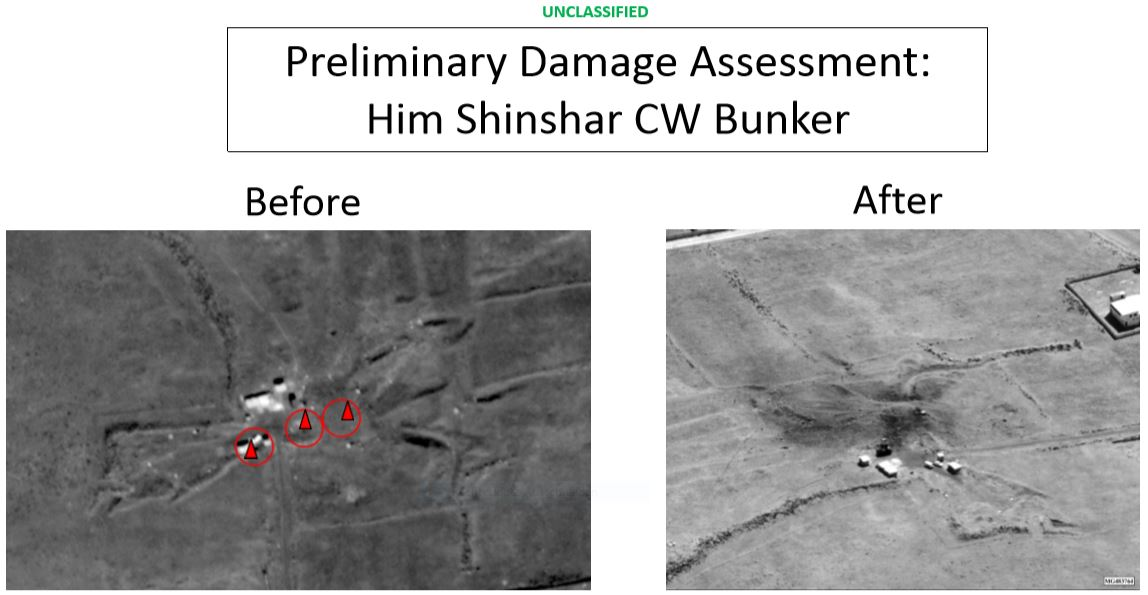
Bunker

The Him Shinshar military installation was a Syrian government military site located west of Homs, Syria. During the 2018 missile strikes against Syria during the Syrian Civil War, two sites were targeted in this vicinity at 34°40′53″N 36°27′58″E and 34°41′42″N 36°32′13″E. According to the United States military, these sites were a "chemical weapons storage facility" and "chemical weapons bunker facility", respectively.

Both sites were destroyed during the April 2018 strike, which was led by the United States with British and French participation. The U.S. military said following the airstrikes that the Him Shinshar complex was "completely destroyed" in the airstrikes.

== See also ==
- Barzah scientific research centre, also targeted during the 2018 bombing
