= Barzeh, Syria =

Barzeh بَرْزَة
- Municipality
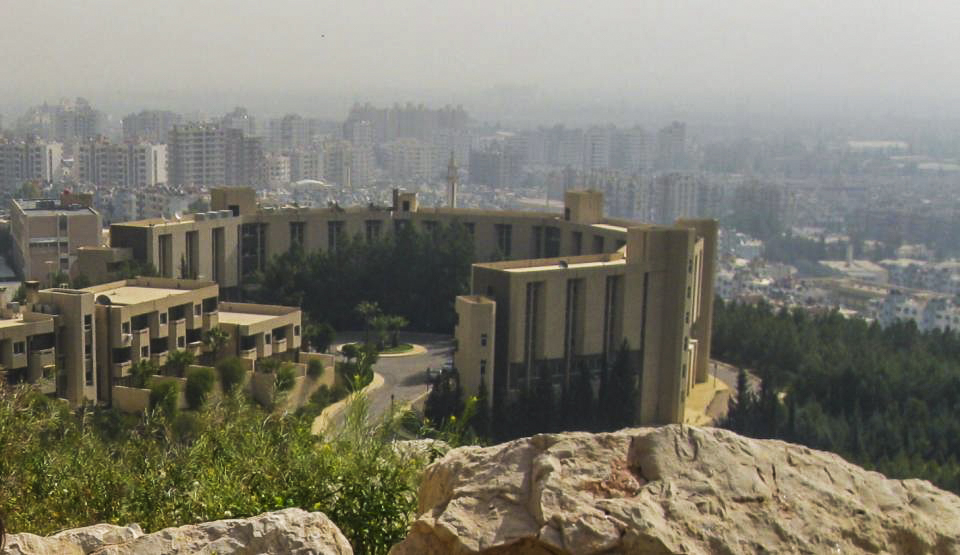
- Barzeh as seen from Mount Qasioun

- District map of Damascus

- Location within Damascus Location within Syria
- Coordinates: 33°33′24″N 36°19′14″E
- Country: Syria
- Governorate: Damascus Governorate
- City: Damascus

Population (2004)
  - Total: 47,339
- Time zone: UTC+3 (EET)
  - Summer (DST): UTC+2 (EEST)
- Climate: BSk

Barzeh or Barza (Arabic: بَرْزَة, romanized: Barzah, also transliterated Berzé) is a municipality and a neighborhood to the north of Damascus, Syria. According to the Syria Central Bureau of Statistics, Barzeh had a population of 47,339 in the 2004 census.

== History ==
Barzeh's foundation dates back to at least Roman times. There is archaeological evidence of Roman and Aramean tombs in the area. Traditionally, it has always been a town of the Ghouta and, therefore, closely linked to agriculture. Rice, oil and olives, and various types of fruit were produced. Barzeh was recorded as Berze on a Tahrir Defter record in 1535; its population at the time consisted of 38 households, 4 bachelors, and a khatib. In the 20th century, it was absorbed into Damascus.

=== Syrian Civil War ===
The municipality had been active in the Syrian civil war. The Sunni Arab Barzeh al-Balad neighborhood was largely pro-rebel. However, the neighboring Alawite "slum" Ish al-Warwar was largely pro-government. The Barzeh area had been under truce between the rebels and government since 2014.

On 1 April 2015, the rebels (Jaish al-Islam and the Free Syrian Army's First Brigade) launched a military campaign to expel the Islamic State of Iraq and the Levant from the Barzeh and Qaboun neighborhoods, which succeeded three days later. On 8 February 2016, an IS car bomb targeting a government officer's club killed eight people in Masakin Barzeh. On 29 May 2017, the Syrian government regained control of the entire district.

But on the night of Dec 7 and early hours of Dec 8, 2024, amid the lightning 2024 Syrian opposition offensives, some residents claimed Syrian rebels(or their recon units) already gained a foothold in Barzeh during the Battle of Damascus.

== Neighborhoods ==
- Al-Abbas (pop. 23,112)
- Barza al-Balad (pop. 31,634)
- Ish al-Warwar (pop. 20,458)
- Al-Manara (pop. 10,199)
- Masakin Barzeh (pop. 15,705)
- An-Nuzha (pop. 6,488)

== Population ==
- 1922: 2000 inhabitants
- 1935: 3500 inhabitants
- 1950: 4,239 inhabitants
- 1960: 6554 inhabitants
- 2004: 47,339 inhabitants

== Education ==
The Higher Institute of Applied Sciences and Technology has its main campus in the Hameesh area of Barzeh.
