= Jdeidat al-Wadi =

Jdeidat al-Wadi جديدة الوادي
- Village
- Location within Syria
- Coordinates: 33.568218°N 36.1895°E
- Country: Syria
- Governorate: Rif Dimashq Governorate
- District: Qudsaya District
- Nahiyah: Qudsaya

Population (2004 census)
  - Total: 5,227
- Time zone: UTC+2 (EET)
  - Summer (DST): UTC+3 (EEST)

Jdeidat al-Wadi or Jdeidat Wadi Barada (Arabic: جديدة الوادي or جديدة وادي بردى) is a village adjacent to the town of Qudsaya and just north of the Mezzeh district of Damascus in Syria. The village is administratively part of the Qudsaya District of the Rif Dimashq Governorate in southern Syria. Nearby localities include al-Hamah to the east, Ashrafiyat al-Wadi to the north, the affluent suburbs of al-Sabboura and Yaafour to the west and Dahiyat Qudsaya to the south. According to the Syria Central Bureau of Statistics, Jdeidat al-Wadi had a population of 5,227 in the 2004 census. Its inhabitants are predominantly Sunni Muslims.

== History ==
In 1838, Eli Smith noted that Jdeidat al-Wadi‘s population was Sunni Muslim.

== Bibliography ==
- Robinson, E.; Smith, E. (1841). Biblical Researches in Palestine, Mount Sinai and Arabia Petraea: A Journal of Travels in the year 1838. Vol. 3. Boston: Crocker & Brewster.
