= History of the Israeli Air Force =

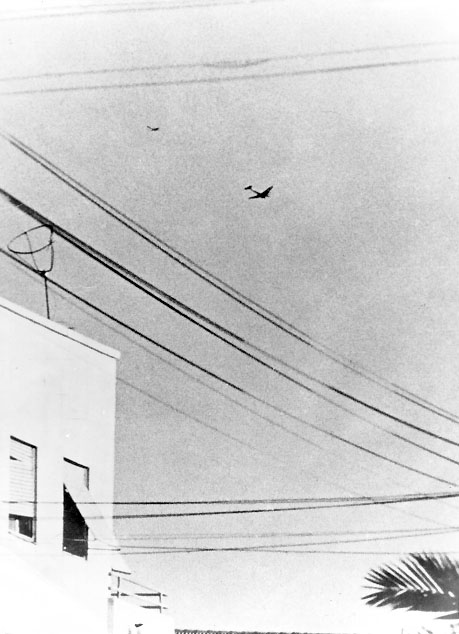
Tel Aviv, June 3, 1948: Modi Alon chases a Royal Egyptian Air Force C-47 in an Avia S-199 to score the IAF's first aerial victory

The History of the Israel Air Force begins in May 1948, shortly after the formation of the State of Israel. Following Israel's declaration of independence on May 14, its pre-state national institutions transformed into the agencies of a state, and on May 26, 1948, the Israeli Air Force was formed. Beginning with a small collection of light aircraft, the force soon transformed into a comprehensive fighting force. It has since participated in several wars and numerous engagements, becoming what has been described as "The mightiest air force in the Middle East".

== Early years (1948–1967) ==
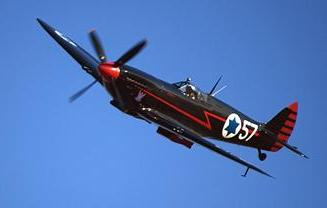
The Black Spitfire

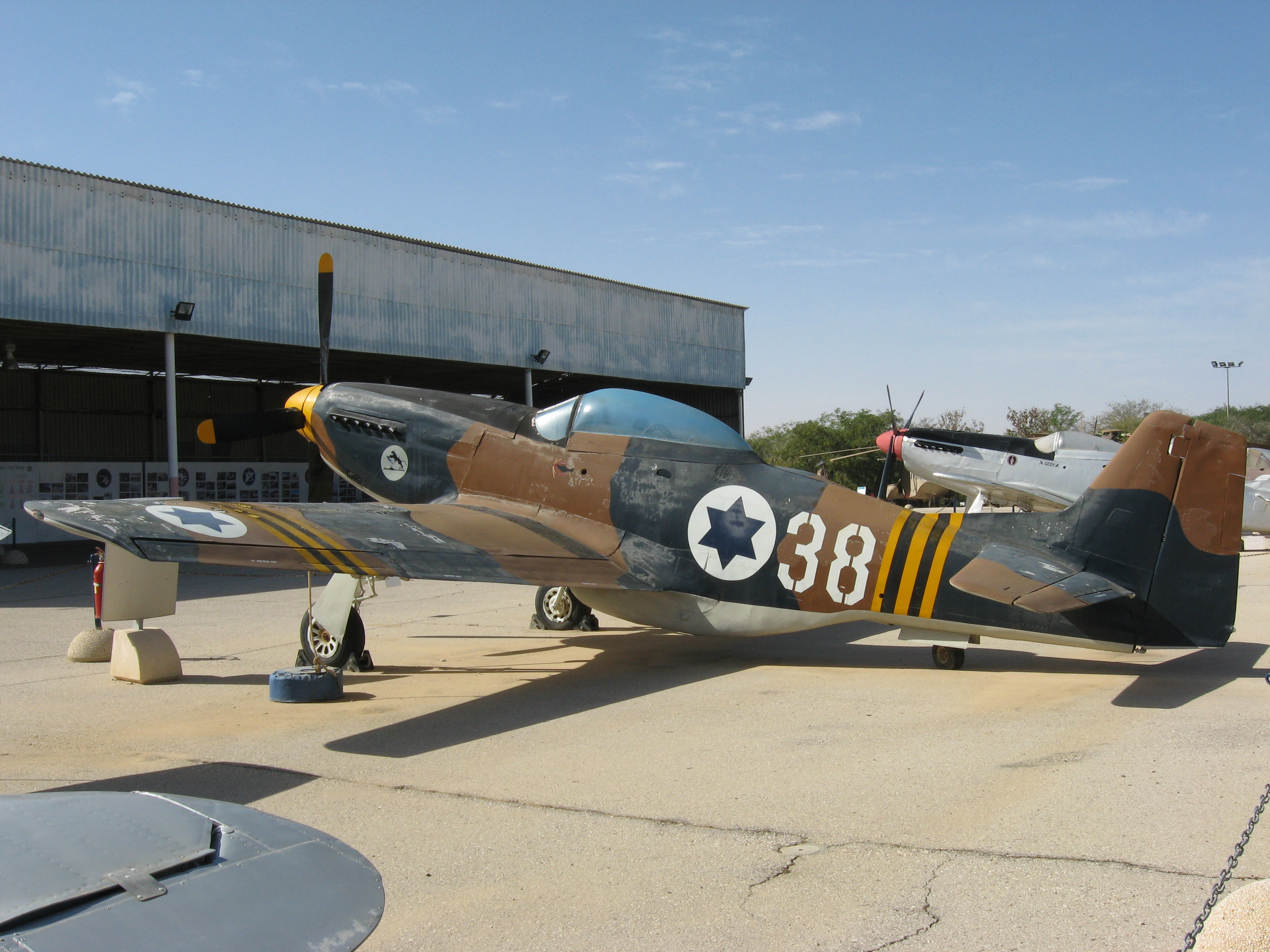
P-51D at the Israeli Air Force Museum; the marking beneath the cockpit notes its participation in the wire-cutting operation at the onset of the Suez Crisis.

Preceded by the Sherut Avir, the air wing of the Haganah, the Israeli Air Force was officially formed on May 28, 1948, shortly after Israel declared statehood and found itself under immediate attack from its Arab neighbors. At first, it was assembled from a hodge-podge collection of civilian aircraft commandeered or donated and converted to military use. A variety of obsolete and surplus ex-World War II combat aircraft were quickly sourced by various means – both legal and illegal – to supplement this fleet. The backbone of the IAF consisted of 25 Avia S-199s (purchased from Czechoslovakia, essentially Czechoslovak-built Messerschmitt Bf 109s) and 60 Supermarine Spitfire LF Mk IXEs, the first of which, "Israel 1" was locally assembled from British abandoned spare parts and a salvaged engine from an Egyptian Spitfire with most of the rest purchased from Czechoslovakia. Some Spitfires were ferried from Žatec base code-named "Zebra" where pilots also received preliminary flight training, while others were transported by sea. Creativity and resourcefulness were the early foundations of Israeli military success in the air, rather than technology (which, at the inception of the IAF, was generally inferior to that used by Israel's adversaries). Many of the first IAF's pilots in 1948 were foreign volunteers (both Jewish and non-Jewish) and World War II veterans, who wanted to collaborate with Israel's struggle for its independence. The IAF's humble beginnings made its first air victories particularly impressive and noteworthy.

Similarly the Air Transport Command begun its existence as the Panamanian registered Lineos Aeros de Panama Society Anonyme or LAPSA acquired C-46 and C-47 aircraft. Of the 607 IAF servicemen who served in the IAF during the War of Independence, over 414 of them were volunteers from overseas.

Israel's new fighter arm first went into action on May 29, 1948, assisting the efforts to halt the Egyptian advance from Gaza northwards. Four newly arrived Avia S-199s, flown by Lou Lenart, Modi Alon, Ezer Weizman and Eddie Cohen, struck Egyptian forces near Isdud. Although damage was minimal, two aircraft were lost and Cohen killed, the attack nevertheless achieved its goal and the Egyptians stopped. The Avias were back in action on May 30, attacking Jordanian forces near Tulkarem, losing another aircraft in the process. After un-assembled planes were strafed on the ground on May 30 at Ekron airfield the fighters were moved to makeshift strip located around the current Herzliya Airport. The airfield was used as it was a bit back from the front lines, and was clandestine since it was a purpose built strip, that was constructed after the beginning of hostilities, in between the orange orchards around Herzliya, and didn't appear on published maps.

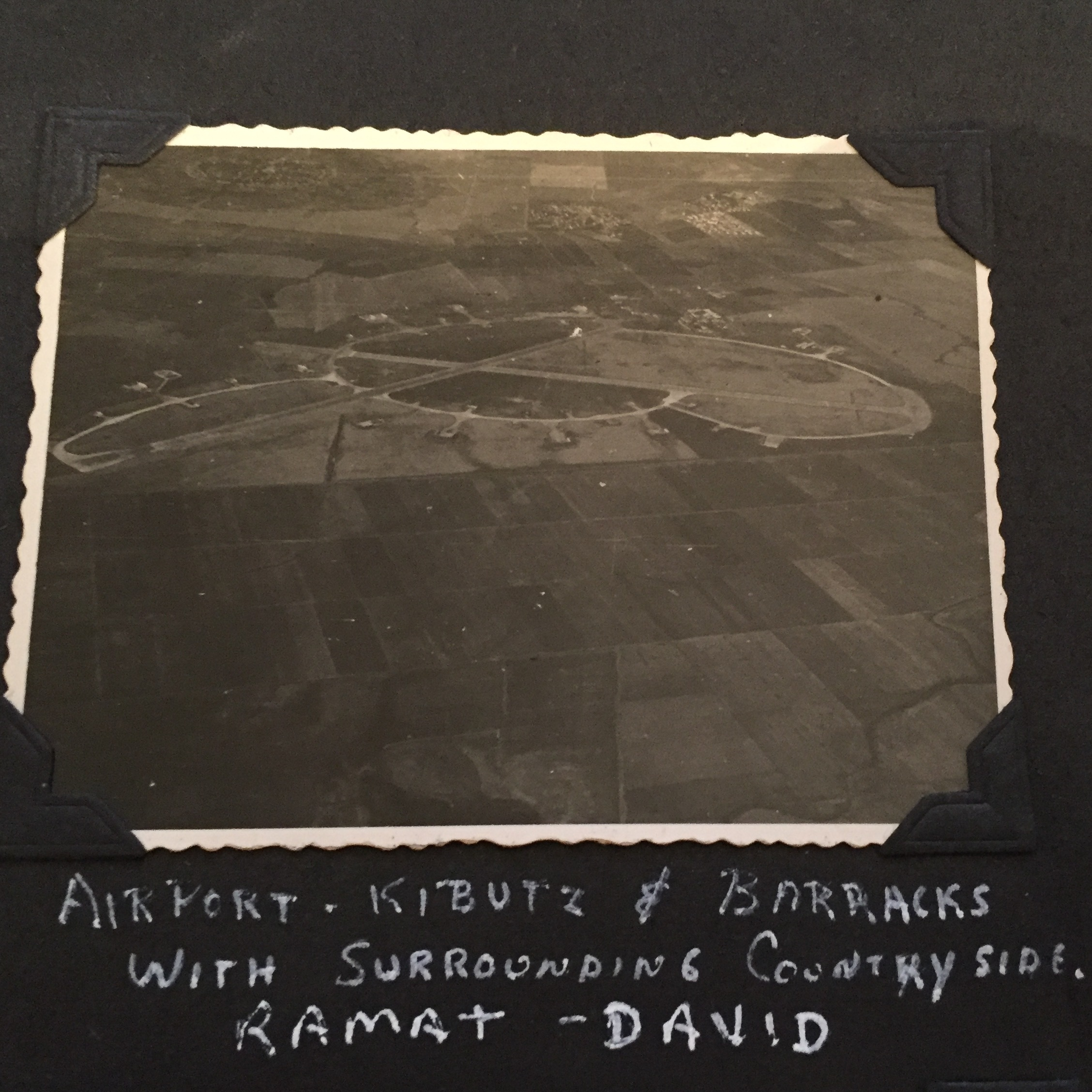
A 1949 aerial view of Ramat David air force base, taken from a B-17.

The Israeli Air Force scored its first aerial victories on June 3 when Modi Alon, flying Avia D.112, shot down two Egyptian Air Force DC-3s which had just bombed Tel Aviv. The first dogfight against enemy fighters took place a few days later, on June 8, when Gideon Lichtaman shot down an Egyptian Spitfire. During these initial operations, the squadron operated with a few planes versus almost complete Arab theater Air supremacy and the airplanes were parked dispersed between the orange trees. The fighters were moved in October to Hatzor Airbase from the Herzliya strip in due to its unsuitability in rainy conditions, probable loss of clandestine status, moving front lines which made former British bases safe for use, and a shift in the balance of air superiority towards the Israelis.

As the war progressed, more and more aircraft were procured, including Boeing B-17s, Bristol Beaufighters, de Havilland Mosquitoes and P-51D Mustangs, leading to a shift in the balance of power. Although the IAF had never secured complete aerial supremacy, by the end of the war it had proven decisive in the air.

The war also saw the IAF clash with Britain's Royal Air Force. During the summer and autumn of 1948 RAF photo-reconnaissance De Havilland Mosquitos of No. 13 Squadron RAF flew routine reconnaissance overflights over Israel. These high-altitude flights remained unchallenged until Israel acquired the Mustang. On November 20, 1948, one such reconnaissance aircraft was spotted over the Galilee and was shot down by Wayne Peake, crashing in the Mediterranean off Ashdod. The IAF and RAF clashed again on January 7, 1949, during Operation Horev, when four RAF Spitfires were shot down, followed by a Hawker Tempest later that day.

The Israeli Air Force played an important part in Operation Kadesh, Israel's part in the 1956 Suez Crisis. At the launch of the operation, on October 29, Israeli P-51D Mustangs severed telephone lines in the Sinai, some using their propeller blades, while 16 IAF DC-3s escorted by fighters carried out Operation Machbesh (Press), dropping Israeli paratroopers behind Egyptian lines at the Mitla Pass. The co-pilot of the lead C-47 in the formation was Yael Rom, one of the IAF's first female pilots and the first trained and certified by the force.

During the 1950s, France became a major supplier of warplanes to Israel, but relations between the two countries deteriorated just before the Six-Day War, when France declared an arms embargo on Israel. Consequently, Israel Aircraft Industries (IAI) significantly increased its aircraft and weapons production (initially based on the French models) and Israel switched to the United States as its principal supplier of military aircraft.

== The Six-Day War ==
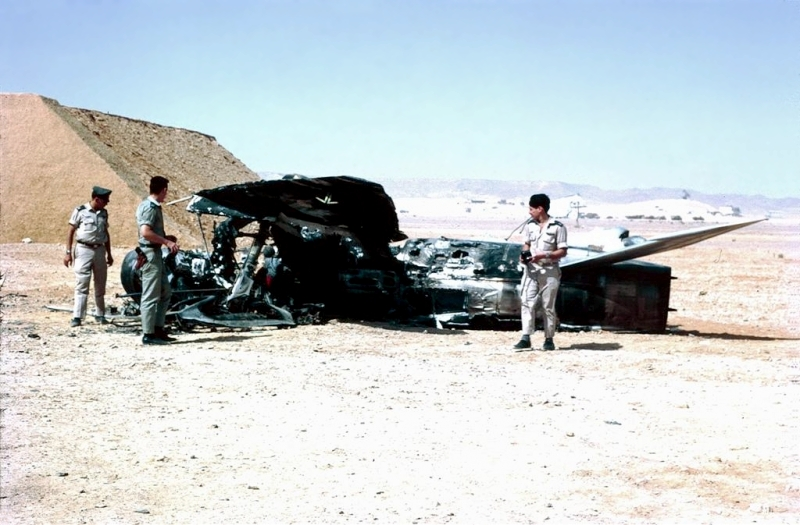
Destroyed MiG-21 at a captured air base in the Sinai

In three hours on the morning of June 5, 1967, the first day of the Six Day War, the Israeli Air Force executed Operation Focus, crippling the opposing Arab air forces and attaining air supremacy for the remainder of the war. In a surprise attack, the IAF destroyed most of the Egyptian Air Force while its planes were still on the ground. By the end of the day, with surrounding Arab countries also drawn into the fighting, the IAF had mauled the Syrian and Jordanian air forces as well, striking as far as Iraq. After six days of fighting Israel claimed a total of 452 Arab aircraft destroyed, of which 49 were aerial victories.

== The War of Attrition ==
Shortly after the end of the Six-Day War, Egypt initiated the War of Attrition, hoping to prevent Israel from consolidating its hold over the lands captured in 1967. Israel's goal in the fighting was to exact heavy losses on the opposing side, in order to facilitate a ceasefire. The Israeli Air Force consequently undertook repeated bombings of strategic targets deep within enemy territory and repeatedly challenged Arab air forces for aerial supremacy, all the while supporting operations by Israel's ground and naval forces. On July 30, 1970, the tension peaked: An IAF ambush resulted in a large scale air brawl between IAF planes and MiGs flown by Soviet pilots – five MiGs were shot down, while the IAF suffered no losses. Fear of further escalation and superpower involvement brought the war to a conclusion. By its end of August 1970, the Israeli Air Force had claimed 111 aerial kills while admitting losing only four aircraft to Arab fighters. Notable operations of the War of Attrition include:

- Operation Rooster 53 – December 26, 1969: IAF Super Frelon and Sikorsky CH-53 Yas'ur helicopters carry paratroopers in a raid to capture an advanced Soviet P-12 radar deployed in Egypt near Suez. A CH-53 helicopter carried the 4-ton radar back to Israeli held territory, tethered underneath it.
- Operation Priha (Blossom) – January 7, 1970 – April 13, 1970: a concentrated series of strikes against military targets in the Egyptian heartland.
- Operation Rhodes – January 22, 1970: Israeli Para and naval commandos are transported by IAF Super Frelon helicopters to Shadwan Island where they kill 30 Egyptian soldiers and take 62 more prisoner. The soldiers dismantle Egyptian radars and other military equipment for transport back to Israel. IAF bombers sink two Egyptian torpedo boats of the P-183 variant during the operation.
- Rimon 20 – July 30, 1970: the IAF shoots down 5 Soviet piloted MiG-21 fighters in a carefully orchestrated ambush.

== Yom Kippur War ==
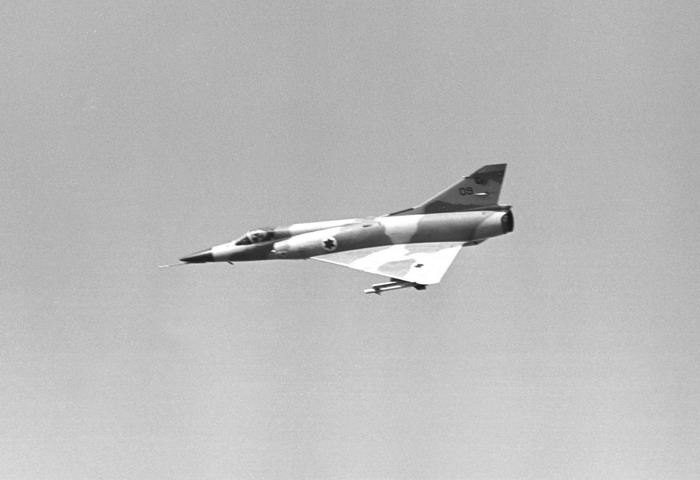
IAI Nesher over the Golan Heights during the Yom Kippur War

Following the War of Attrition and its battles with Egyptian air defenses, the IAF spent the next years developing new SEAD tactics and weapons and in renewed reconnaissance efforts. New weapons such as the AGM-45 Shrike and AGM-12 Bullpup were introduced and the IAF was confident that it could deal with the threats posed by enemy air defenses and be able to provide Israeli ground forces with essential close air support. On the eve of the Yom Kippur War Israel fielded 390 combat aircraft, of which 100 were F-4 Phantoms, 165 A-4 Skyhawks, 65 Dassault Mirage IIIs and IAI Neshers and 20 IAI Sa'ars (upgraded Dassault Super Mysteres).

On October 6, 1973, with war imminent, the IAF begun preparing for a pre-emptive strike against Egyptian and Syrian airfields and anti-aircraft positions. The Israeli government, however, decided against pre-emption. IAF aircraft were therefore in the process of re-armament to the air-to-air role when hostilities began at 14:00. One of the first encounters of the war was the Ofira Air Battle, involving two Israeli Phantoms versus 28 Egyptian MiG-17s and MiG-21s. In the aerial combat that ensued, the Phantom pair managed to down 7 to 8 Egyptian planes and driving off the rest. The next morning begun with Operation Tagar, a SEAD offensive against Egyptian air defenses, beginning with strikes against Egyptian air bases. Tagar, however, was quickly discontinued when the dire situation on the Golan Heights became apparent. IAF efforts were redirected north, where the ill-fated Operation Model 5 was carried out. Flying with outdated intelligence and no electronic screening against mobile SAM batteries and heavy flak, 6 IAF Phantoms were lost. 2 airmen were killed and 9 captured. The detailed planning and extensive training undertaken before the war had gone to waste and the sustained campaign required to defeat enemy air defenses was abandoned in the face of Egyptian and Syrian advances. The IAF was forced to operate under the SAM threat, yet the close air support it provided allowed Israeli troops on the ground to stem the tide and eventually go on the offensive, first in the north and later in the south.

After the failed Israeli counter-offensive in the Sinai on October 8, the southern front remained relatively static and the IAF focused its attention on the Syrian front. While A-4 Skyhawks provided much needed support to troops on the ground, at the cost of 31 aircraft by the end of fourth day of the war, IAF Phantoms repeatedly struck Syrian air fields. Following Syrian FROG-7 strikes on military and civilian targets in northern Israel, the IAF also initiated a campaign to destroy the infrastructure on which Syria's war-making capacity depended, targeting strategic targets in Syria such as its oil industry and electricity generating system. On October 9, 1973, seven F-4 Phantoms attacked and destroyed the Syrian General Staff Headquarters in the heart of Damascus, damaging Syrian Air Force Headquarters as well. By October 13 the Syrians had been pushed back and beyond their initial lines, Damascus had come within range of Israeli artillery and an Iraqi armored brigade, the vanguard of its expeditionary force, was destroyed. With the threat to northern Israel removed, IAF attention switched to the south once more.

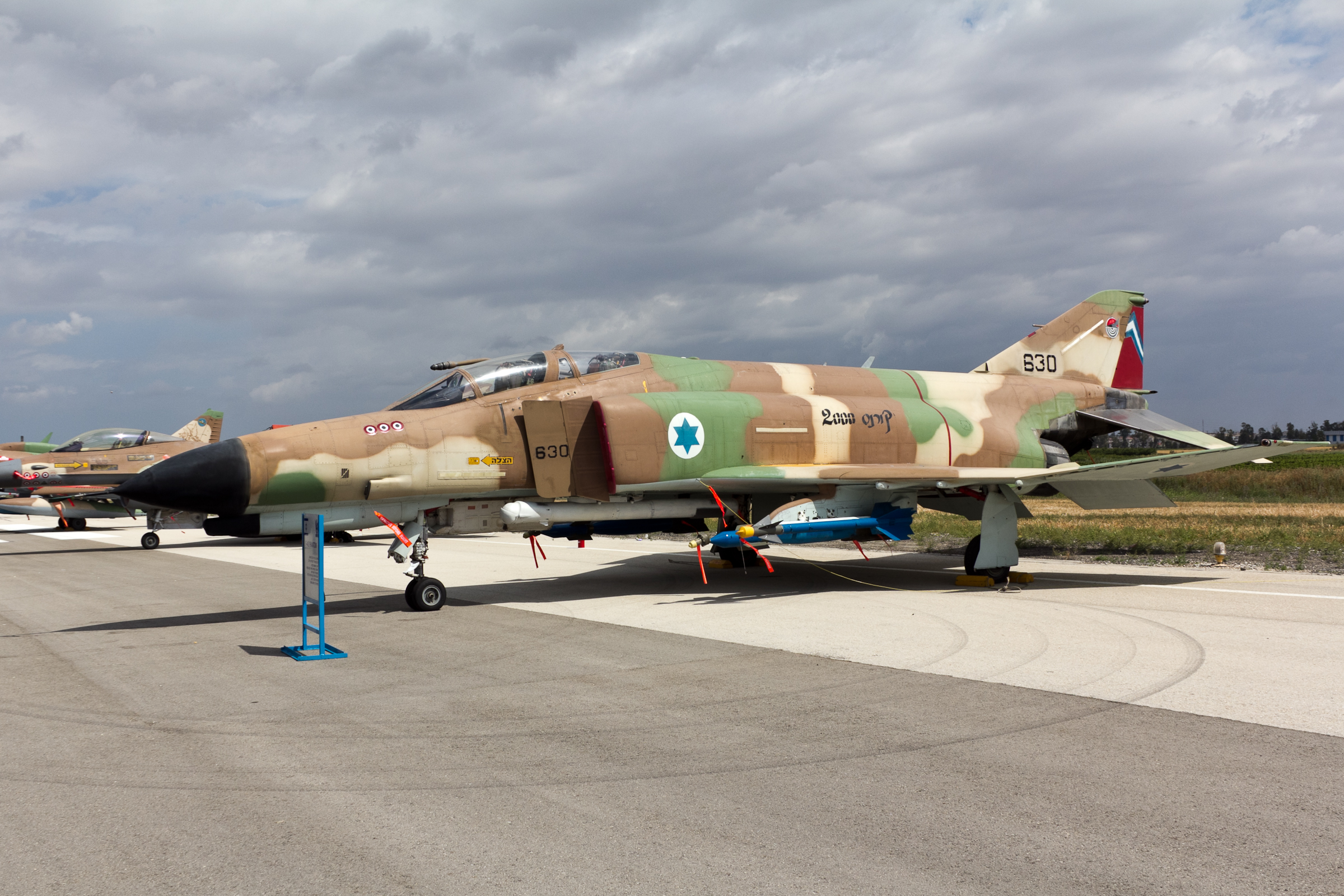
201 Squadron IAF F-4E Phantom II with 3 kill markings

On October 14 the Egyptian army launched an offensive along the entire front, but was repulsed by the IDF. Israel followed on this success by attacking at the seam between the 2nd and 3rd Egyptian armies and crossing the Suez Canal into Egypt. Israeli forces fanned north and south, destroying Egyptian rear units and punching holes through its air defense array. This allowed the IAF the freedom of action it was previously denied and renewed attacks led to the collapse of the Egyptian Air Defense Force. This prompted increased activity by the Egyptian Air Force, and from about October 18 to the end of the war, intensive air battles took place between Israeli and Egyptian aircraft.

October 14 also witnessed the beginning of Operation Nickel Grass, the American airlift to Israel, 5 days after the Soviet Union had commenced a similar endeavour for its Arab allies. The same day witnessed the IAF strike the Egyptian air base at Tanta and Mansoura, strikes that continued into the next day, while Syrian air bases were revisited on subsequent days. IAF Mirages and Neshers scored 14 aerial victories on October 18, including 3 Libyan Mirages. On October 21 Israeli forces captured the Egyptian air base of Fayid, which became a hub for Israeli transports flying supplies to Israeli troops on the east bank of the Suez canal. Nicknamed Nachshon, the base was inaugurated on October 23 when a damaged Nesher made an emergency landing at the field. The air bases at Kibrit, Kasfreet, and Shalufa were also captured, but were not utilized. In the last air battle of the war, at noon on October 24, a dozen more enemy aircraft were shot down. These included three kills by Giora Epstein, bringing his total to 17 aircraft and making him the world's high-scoring ace of the jet era as well as Israel's all-time highest scoring ace.

Official Israeli Air Force losses of the war number at 102 aircraft, including 32 F-4 Phantoms, 53 A-4 Skyhawks, 11 Dassault Mirages, and 6 IAI Sa'ars, although other accounts suggest as many as 128 Israeli aircraft were lost. 91 air force personnel, of which 53 were airmen, were killed. 172 Egyptian aircraft were shot down in air-to-air combat, for a loss of between 5 and 21 for the Israelis (on all fronts). No official numbers were released on the Arab side, though total Egyptian losses were between 235 and 242 aircraft, while Syria lost between 135 and 179.

== Growth (1973–1982) ==
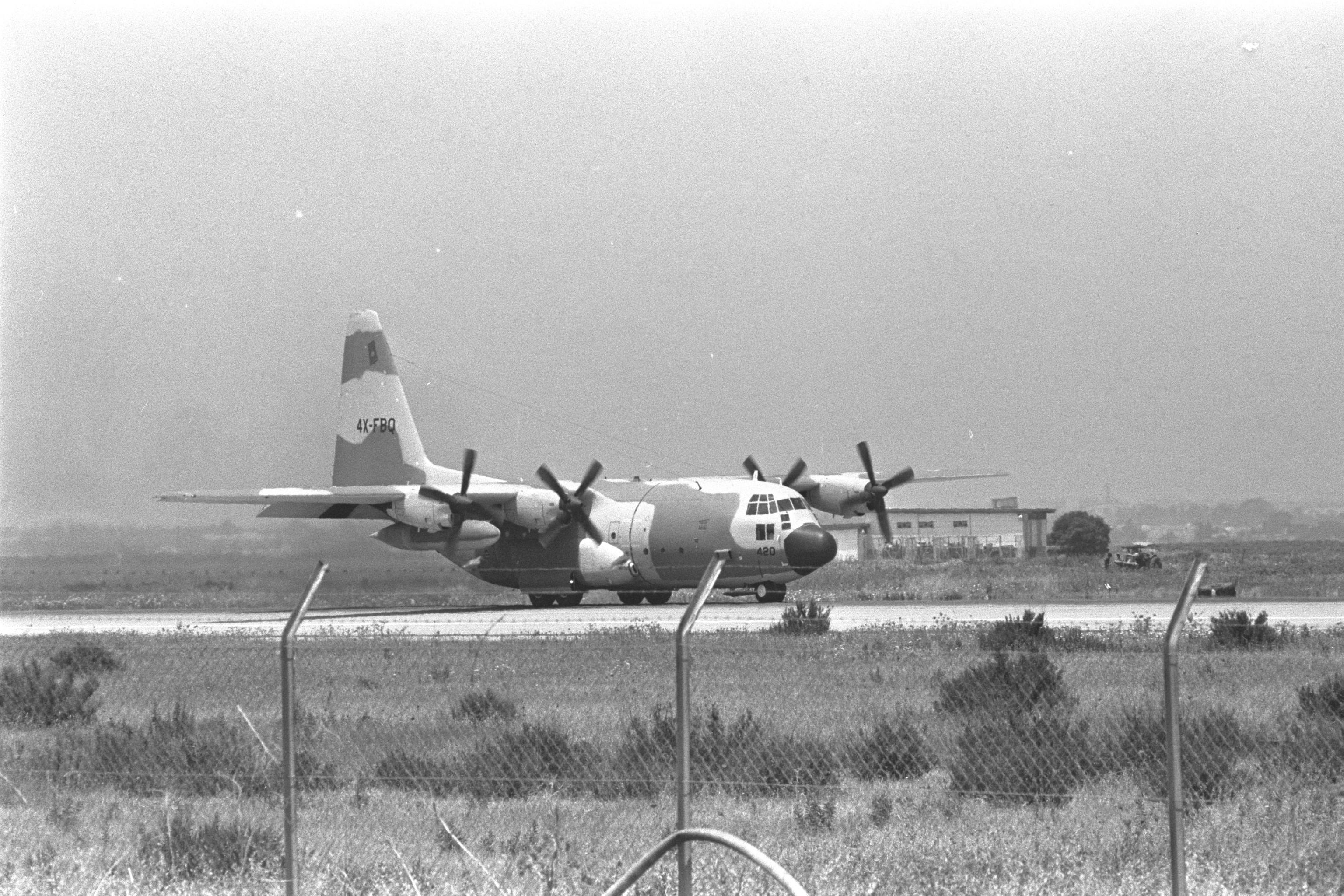
IAF C-130 Hercules lands at Ben-Gurion Airport carrying hijacked Air France passengers rescued in Operation Thunderball

Ever since the Yom Kippur War, most of Israel's military aircraft have been obtained from the United States. Among these are the F-4 Phantom II, A-4 Skyhawk, F-15 Eagle, F-16 Fighting Falcon, and E-2 Hawkeye. The Israeli Air Force has also operated a number of domestically produced types such as the IAI Nesher, and later, the more advanced IAI Kfir, which were unauthorised derivatives of the French Dassault Mirage 5 (Israel bought 50 Mirage 5s from Dassault Aviation, but they were not delivered due to the French embargo imposed following the Six-Day war). The Kfir was adapted to utilise a more powerful US engine, produced under license in Israel.

In 1976, IAF C-130 Hercules aircraft participated in Operation Thunderbolt, the rescue from Entebbe, Uganda, of the hostages of Air France flight 139. In March 1978, the Israeli Air Force participated in Operation Litani.

=== Operation Opera ===
On June 7, 1981, eight IAF F-16A fighters escorted by six F-15A jets carried out Operation Opera to destroy the Iraqi nuclear facilities of Osiraq. The eight F-16As, each armed with two unguided Mark-84 2,000-pound delay-action bombs, were manned by Ze'ev Raz, Amos Yadlin, Dobbi Yaffe, Hagai Katz, Amir Nachumi, Iftach Spector, Relik Shafir, and Ilan Ramon, Israel's first astronaut.

== 1982 Lebanon War ==
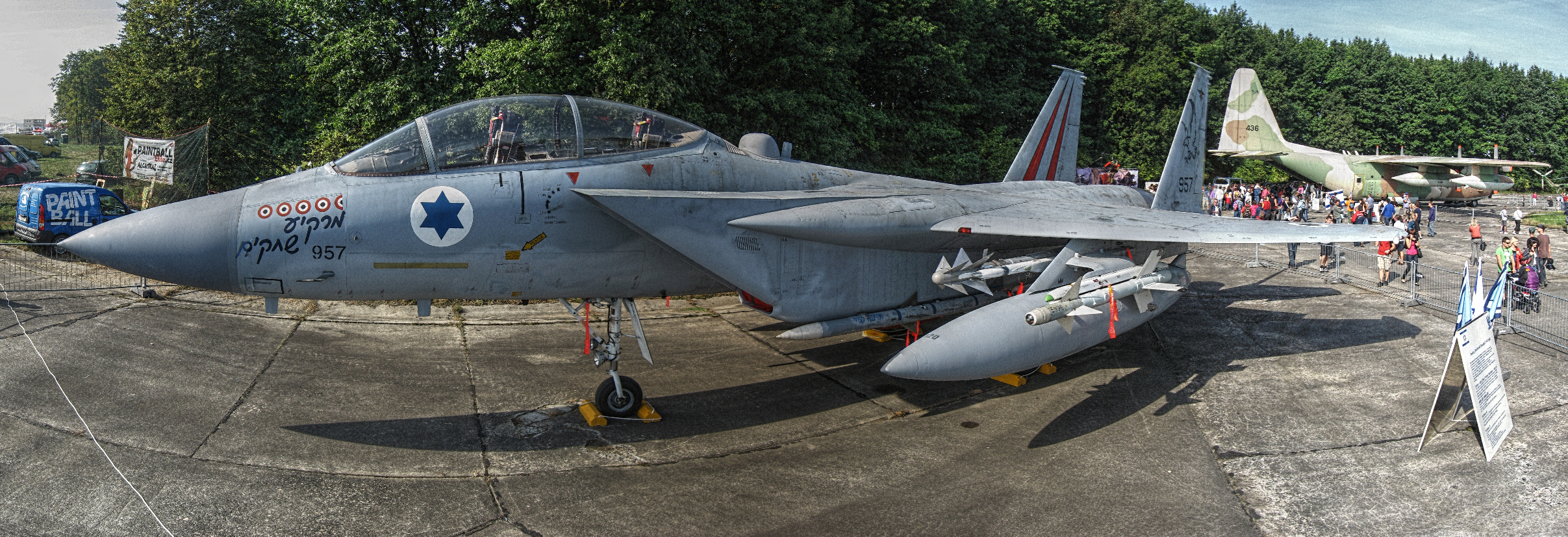
F-15D 957 "Sky Blazer", a veteran of fighting in Lebanon with 4.5 aerial victories

Prior to the 1982 Lebanon War, Syria, with the help of the Soviet Union, had built up an overlapping network of surface-to-air missiles in Lebanon's Beqaa Valley. On June 9, 1982 the Israeli Air Force carried out Operation Mole Cricket 19, crippling the Syrian air defense array. In subsequent aerial battles against the Syrian Air Force, the IAF managed to shoot down 86 Syrian aircraft without losing a single fighter plane in an air-to-air combat. IAF AH-1 Cobra helicopter gunships destroyed dozens of Syrian armored fighting vehicles and other ground targets, including some T-72 main battle tanks.

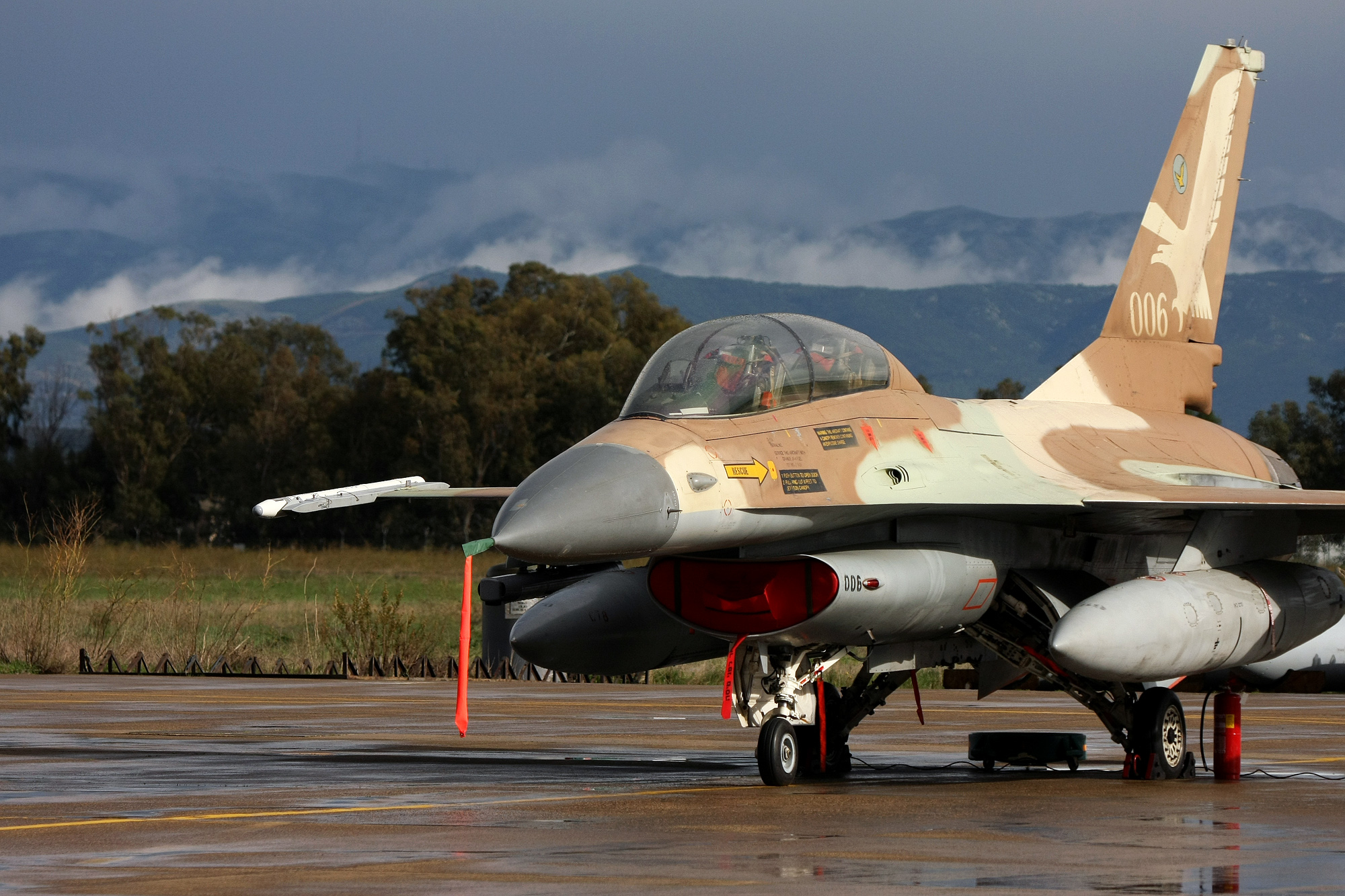
140 Squadron F-16B, Sardinia 2010

In 1986 an IAF F-4 Phantom, piloted by pilot Yishai Aviram was inadvertently damaged midair and abandoned, resulting in the capture of flight navigator then-Captain Ron Arad by the Lebanese Shi'ite militia Amal. To this day, the whereabouts of Arad has not been disclosed by his captors.

For many years after the war's official end, and throughout Israeli presence in Lebanon, IAF AH-1 Cobras continued to mount attacks on Hezbollah and PLO positions in south Lebanon.

=== Operation Wooden Leg ===
On October 1, 1985, In response to a PLO terrorist attack which murdered three Israeli civilians in Cyprus, the Israeli air force carried out Operation Wooden Leg. The strike involved the bombing of PLO Headquarters in Tunis, Tunisia, by F-15 Eagles. This was the longest combat mission ever undertaken by the IAF, a stretch of 2,300 kilometers, involving in-flight refueling by an IAF Boeing 707. As a result, PLO headquarters and barracks were either destroyed or damaged.

== 1990s and beyond ==
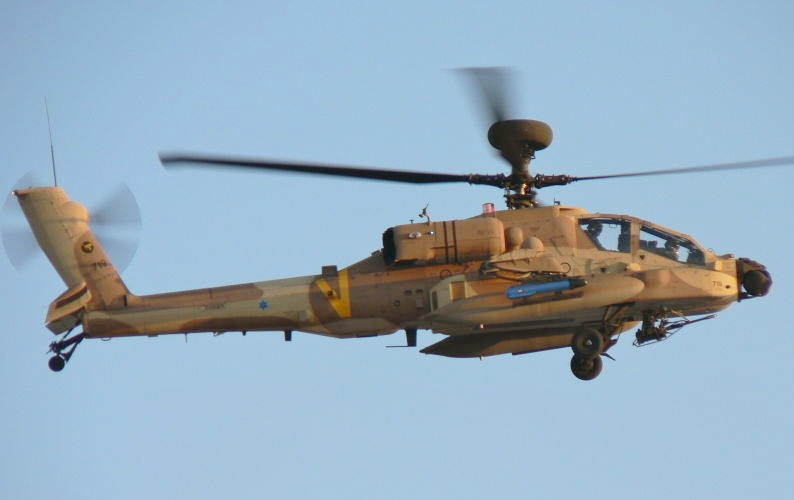
AH-64D Saraph

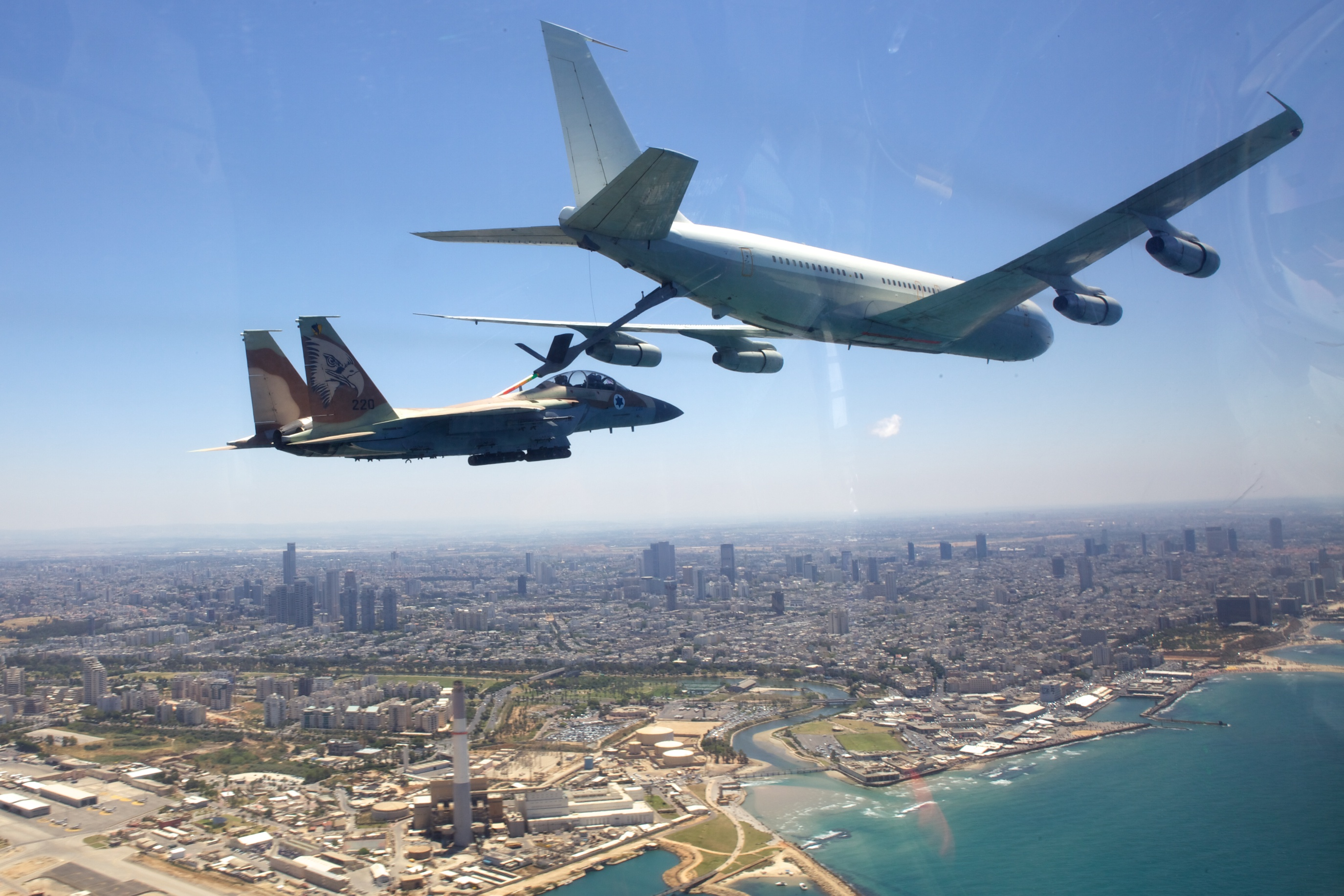
69 Squadron F-15I taking fuel from a 120 Squadron KC-707 over Tel Aviv, Independence Day 2011

Many of the IAF's electronics and weapons systems are developed and built in Israel by Israel Military Industries, Israel Aerospace Industries, Elbit, and others. Since the 1990s, the IAF has upgraded most of its aircraft with advanced Israeli-made systems, improving their performances. In 1990 the IAF began receiving the AH-64 Apache helicopter gunship and started equipping its aircraft with the Rafael Python 4, Popeye, and Derby missiles.

During the first Gulf War of 1991, Israel was attacked by Iraqi Scud missiles. Israeli Air Force pilots were on constant stand-by in their cockpits throughout the conflict, ready to fly to Iraq to retaliate. Diplomatic pressure as well as denial of IFF (Identify Foe or Friend) transponder codes from the United States, however, kept the IAF grounded while Coalition air assets and Patriot missile batteries supplied by the U.S. and the Netherlands sought to deal with the Scuds.

In 1991, the IAF carried out Operation Solomon which brought Ethiopian Jews to Israel. In 1993 and 1996, the IAF participated in Operation Accountability and Operation Grapes of Wrath, respectively.

In the late 1990s, the IAF began acquiring the F-15I Ra'am (Thunder) and the F-16I Sufa (Storm), manufactured specially for Israel according to IAF requirements. The first of 102 F-16I Sufas arrived in April 2004, joining an F-16 fleet that had already been the largest outside the US Air Force. The IAF also purchased the advanced Israeli air-to-air missile Rafael Python 5, with full-sphere capability, as well as a special version of the Apache Longbow, designated AH-64DI or Saraph. In 2005 the Israeli Air Force received modified Gulfstream V jets ("Nachshon"), equipped with advanced intelligence systems made by Israel Military Industries. By 2013 Israel became the world's largest exporter of drones. In December 2016, Israel received its first pair of F-35 Lightning II from the United States.

In 2004 it was renamed the Israeli Air and Space Force to reflect the addition of space to its mission set.

The Israeli Air Force took an extensive part in IDF operations during the al-Aqsa Intifada, including the controversial targeted killings of Palestinian militant leaders, most notably Salah Shakhade, Mahmoud Abu-Hunud, Abu Ali Mustafa, Ahmed Yassin, Adnan al-Ghoul, Jamal Abu Samhadana, and Abed al-Aziz Rantissi. While this policy was criticized due to the collateral damage caused in certain instances, Israel claims it is vital in its fight against terrorism and that IAF pilots do whatever they can to avoid civilian casualties, including aborting strikes.

In 2007, Israel achieved a civilian casualty ratio of 1:30, or one civilian casualty for every thirty combatant casualties, in its airstrikes on militants in the Gaza Strip. Commentators have noted that, "No army in history has ever had a better ratio of combatants to civilians killed in a comparable setting".

On October 5, 2003, the Israeli Air Force attacked an alleged Palestinian militant training camp in Ain es Saheb, Syria.

== 2006 Lebanon War ==
The IAF played a critical role in the 2006 Lebanon War by leading the Israeli attacks on Lebanon. These strikes – mainly, though not exclusively, in southern Lebanon – were aimed at stopping rocket launches by Hezbollah's militia targeting Israeli towns. The IAF flew more than 12,000 combat missions during this war. The most notable mission, taking place on the second day of the war, resulted in the IAF destroying 59 Iranian-supplied medium- and long-range missile launchers in just 34 minutes. Widespread condemnation followed the July 30 IAF airstrike on a building suspected to be a militant hideout near the village of Qana, in which 28 civilians were killed. Hezbollah shot down an IAF CH-53 Yas'ur helicopter on the last day of the war, killing five crew members. Earlier, an IAF F-16I had crashed during take-off. Israeli aircraft also shot down three of Hezbollah's Iranian-made aerial drones during the conflict.

== Gaza-Israel conflict and parallel activities ==
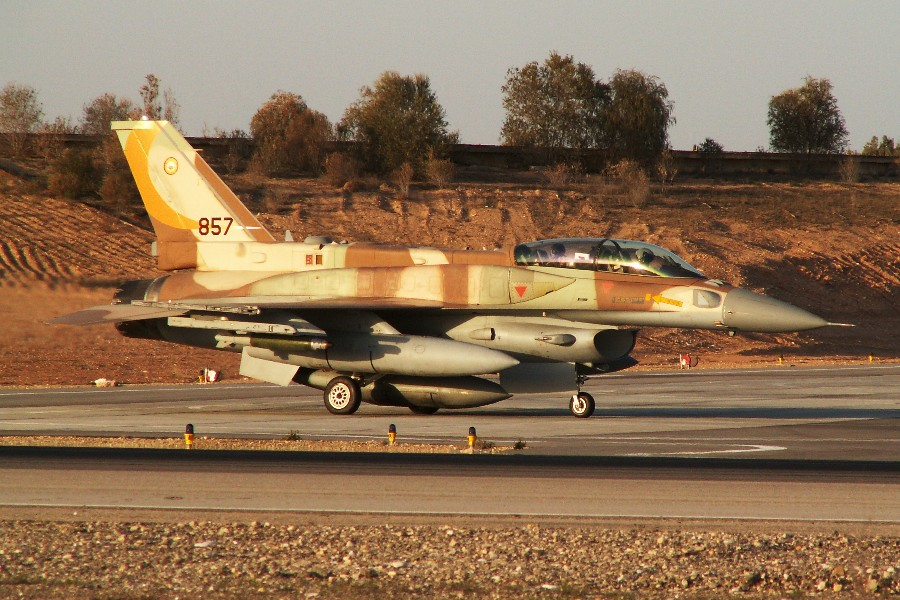
F-16I prepares to strike enemy targets during the Gaza War

On September 6, 2007, the Israeli Air Force allegedly bombed a Syrian nuclear reactor in Operation Orchard.

The Israel Air Force spearheaded Operation Cast Lead (2008–2009), carrying out more than 2,360 air strikes. It had a principal role in destroying Hamas targets, though civilian casualties and damage to civilian facilities and infrastructure in the Gaza Strip led human rights groups to accuse Israel of war crimes. Israel claimed that some locations were used to launch rockets at Israel. The IAF also killed several senior Hamas commanders including Said Seyam, Nizar Rayan, Tawfik Jaber, and Abu Zakaria al-Jamal.

According to a CBS news report, in January 2009 Israeli planes struck a convoy of trucks in Sudan that was headed for Egypt and carrying weapons apparently meant for the Gaza Strip. 17 trucks had been bombed and 39 smugglers had been killed in the strike. On April 5, 2011 a car driving from Port Sudan Airport to Port Sudan was destroyed by a missile. Both passengers, one of which may have been a senior Hamas military commander, were killed. The Sudanese Foreign Minister blamed the attack on Israel. Sudanese newspapers reported that Israeli aircraft attacked Gaza-bound arms convoys again in late 2011. On October 24, 2012, Sudan claimed that the previous day Israel had bombed a munitions factory south of Khartoum, which allegedly participated in arms-smuggling to Hamas. The Israeli government refused to either confirm or deny its involvement.

In November 2012, the IAF participated in Operation Pillar of Defense, during which, according to the IDF Spokesperson, Israeli forces targeted more than 1,500 military sites in Gaza Strip, including rocket launching pads, smuggling tunnels, command centers, weapons manufacturing and storage buildings. Many of these attacks were carried out by the Air Force.

Between July 8 and August 5, 2014, the IAF participated in Operation Protective Edge, during which, according to the IDF Spokesperson, Israeli forces targeted 4,762 terror sites across the Gaza Strip, including rocket launching facilities, command and control centers, military administration facilities, weapons storage and manufacturing facilities, and training and military compounds. During the operation, Israeli air defense forces downed two unmanned aerial vehicles launched from the Gaza Strip.

In May 2021, Israeli air force and artillery carried out 1,500 strikes on Gaza during Operation Guardian of the Walls.

The Israeli Air Force participated extensively in the Gaza war.

== Incidents during the Syrian Civil War ==
On 23 September 2014, a Syrian Air Force Su-24 was shot down by an IAF MIM-104 Patriot surface-to-air missile battery, after allegedly crossing the Syrian-Israeli ceasefire line during a ground attack mission against Syrian opposition forces. Both pilots ejected from the stricken aircraft and were taken prisoner by Syrian rebels.

On 29 July 2015, Israeli airplanes reportedly struck a vehicle located in a Druse village in southwestern Syria, killing Hezbollah men and a pro-Assad militiaman. A second airstrike targeted a military base along the Syrian-Lebanese border belonging to a pro-Syrian Palestinian faction. On 20 and 21 August 2015, after four rockets hit the Golan Heights and Upper Galilee, Israel launched airstrikes in Syria, killing several militants.

On March 17, 2017, Israeli jet fighters attacked targets in Syria. Several S-200 missiles were fired at the jets, and one missile was shot down by an Arrow 2 missile; no aircraft were damaged. Syria claimed to have shot down one attacking aircraft and damaged another, a claim denied by Israel. The incident was the first clearly confirmed Israeli strike on Syrian territory during the Syrian Civil War.

On February 10, 2018, an Israeli AH-64 shot down an Iranian drone that entered Israel. Four Israeli F-16's launched a strike into Syria while remaining in Israeli airspace, reportedly to strike Iranian drone control facilities, conducting a cross-border raid. One of them was shot down by Syrian air defense forces and crashed in northern Israel. Both pilots were injured, but managed to eject. Israel subsequently attacked Syrian air defenses and Iranian targets.

On May 10, 2018, after Iranian elite forces on the Syrian-held side of the Golan Heights fired around 20 projectiles towards Israeli army positions without causing damages or injuries, Israel responded with rounds of rocket fire into Syria. The Israeli Air Force confirmed the strikes. Twenty-three fighters, among them 18 foreigners, were killed. IAF commander Amikam Norkin said Israel used its F-35s for the first time.

On July 11, 2018, after an Israeli Patriot missile intercepted a Syrian reconnaissance drone which infiltrated into northern Israel, the latter attacked three Syrian military posts in the Quneitra area.

=== Alleged Air Strikes ===
On January 30, 2013, Israeli aircraft allegedly struck a Syrian convoy transporting weapons to Hezbollah. Other sources stated the targeted site was a military research center in Jamraya responsible for developing biological and chemical weapons. Two additional air strikes reportedly took place on May 3 and 5, 2013. Both allegedly targeted long-ranged weapons sent from Iran to Hezbollah.

According to anonymous US officials, Israel launched another attack on 5 July 2013, though Syrian rebels were also suspected in the incident. The July 2013 incident allegedly targeted Russian-made Yakhont anti-ship missiles near the city of Latakia, and killed several Syrian troops. Israel is suspected to have carried out another raid on October 30, 2013. The attack occurred at an air defense site in Snawbar, 10 miles south of Latakia. Syrian opposition sources, as well as Lebanese sources, reported that another strike took place in Latakia on January 26, 2014. The targets were allegedly S-300 missiles.

It was reported that Israeli aircraft carried out two airstrikes against Hezbollah facilities in Lebanon near the border with Syria on February 24, 2014, killing several militants. The Syrian Observatory for Human Rights claimed the attack targeted a Hezbollah missile base.

On December 7, 2014, Israeli jets allegedly bombed areas near Damascus International Airport and in the town of Dimas, near the border with Lebanon. According to foreign reports the attack targeted a warehouse of advanced S-300 missiles, which were en route from Syria to Hezbollah in Lebanon.

On 18 January 2015, Israeli helicopters allegedly attacked a Hezbollah's convoy in the Syrian-controlled part of the Golan Heights, killing six prominent members of Hezbollah and six IRGC commanders, including a General. The Al-Nusra Front, however, also took responsibility on the assassination, claiming it was an ambush in another location.

On 25 April 2015, a series of attacks attributed to the Israeli Air Force took place in the al-Qalamoun region of Syria against Hezbollah camps and weapons convoys in two brigade bases.

On 29 July 2015, Israeli aircraft reportedly struck a vehicle in a Druze village in southwestern Syria, killing Hezbollah men and a pro-Assad militiaman. A second airstrike targeted a military base along the Syrian-Lebanese border belonging to a pro-Syrian Palestinian faction.

According to Syrian media, on October 31, 2015, Israeli aircraft attacked numerous Hezbollah targets in southern Syria, close to the border with Lebanon in the Qalamoun Mountains region. Estimated targets included a weapons convoy destined for Hezbollah. It was reported another Israeli airstrike near Damascus airport on November 11 that targeted Hezbollah weapons warehouses.

The Syrian opposition reported an Israeli airstrike in the Qualamoun area of the Syria-Lebanon border on 23 November 2015. According to these sources, the strike killed 13 Syrian troops and Hezbollah fighters, and left dozens wounded, including four seriously. The Qualamoun region has been a major transit point for Hezbollah fighters and other logistical equipment to and from Syria. According to Syrian sources, Israeli aircraft attacked again Syrian army and Hezbollah targets in the area around Qalamoun on November 28, causing dead and wounded among Hezbollah fighters.

On 20 December 2015, an explosion in a six-story residential building of Jaramana killed eight Syrian nationals, among them Hezbollah field commanders. Hezbollah claimed the building was destroyed by Takfiri militia, though Lebanese media initially attributed the attack to the IAF. Samir Kuntar was among those killed.

Sources affiliated with the Syrian opposition reported that Israeli aircraft attacked seven positions belonging to Hezbollah in the Qalamoun Mountains area on December 26, 2015.

Arab media reported that on November 30, 2016, Israeli jets struck a Syrian military compound in Damascus and a Hezbollah weapons convoy in the Damascus-Beirut highway.

On December 7, 2016, Syria and Hezbollah accused Israel of launching surface-to-surface missiles targeting the Mezzeh airbase near Damascus. Unnamed Syrian sources told Lebanese newspaper Elnashra that the strikes targeted the airport's runway and operations command center, while another unnamed source said that the strikes targeted the regime's 4th division operations center at the airport. A Syrian opposition group said the target was a convoy of chemical weapons en route to Hezbollah.

On January 12, 2017, Israeli warplanes struck Mezzeh airbase in rural Damascus again. According to Al-Masdar field correspondent, the target was an ammunition depot, causing a massive explosion that could be heard from the Syrian capital. On February 22, 2017, Israeli jets struck a Hezbollah weapons shipment near Damascus.

On 27 April 2017, Syria's state-run SANA news agency reported an explosion at 3:42 am at Damascus International Airport. The blast was reportedly felt 15 kilometres (9.3 mi) away, though there were no casualties. The Israeli Intelligence Minister Yisrael Katz appeared to take responsibility for the explosion, telling Army Radio that "The incident in Syria corresponds completely with Israel's policy to act to prevent Iran's smuggling of advanced weapons via Syria to Hezbollah. Two rebel sources told Reuters that "five strikes hit an ammunition depot used by Iran-backed militias."

Syria accused Israel of carrying out an airstrike on September 5, 2017, against weapons convoys en route to Hezbollah and a scientific research center in the area of Hama where chemical weapons are manufactured. On 22 September 2017, some sources reported that Israeli jets carried out three separate strikes on targets near the Damascus International Airport, which the SOHR reported to have struck Hezbollah weapons depots. On November 1 Arab media claimed Israeli jets allegedly bombed a weapons depot situated in rural areas around Hisya, south of Homs. Several reports claimed that the Syrians launched a surface-to-air missile against Israeli aircraft but did not hit them.

Arab media outlets reported that Israeli aircraft targeted an Iranian base near the town of al-Kiswah on December 2, 2017. Syrian state television corroborated the report, stating that Syria's air defense system was able to shoot down three of the five air-to-surface missiles launched from Lebanese airspace at the compound. The remaining two missiles detonated near the cache. Syrian state media reported that two days later Israel fired missiles at a military facility in the Damascus countryside, intercepting three of the missiles. A witness told Reuters that three strong explosions were heard from the direction of Jamraya, which contains a military research facility that was supposedly hit by an Israeli attack in 2013.

According to Syrian army sources, Israeli aircraft struck the al-Qutaifa area near Damascus from inside Lebanese airspace on January 9, 2018. Syrian air defenses claimed hitting one of the planes and intercepting ground-to-ground rockets launched from Israeli-held territory in the Golan Heights. According to sources from the Syrian opposition, Israeli aircraft attacked a Hezbollah arms depot in a military airport near Damascus on January 17, 2018.

On February 7, 2018, Syrian state media said that Israeli warplanes attacked a military position in the Damascus countryside from Lebanese airspace, with Syrian air defenses destroying most of the missiles. Other reports stated that the target was the Scientific Research Center in Jamraya, west of Damascus, and that the same position had been targeted by Israel twice before. Some activists claim that the position contains arms depots used by Hezbollah.

Russia and Syria accused Israel of carrying out an airstrike on April 9, 2018, against Tiyas air base, also known as the T-4 air base, outside Palmyra in central Syria. The Russian defense ministry said the Israeli aircraft launched eight missiles at the base from Lebanese airspace, five of which were intercepted by Syrian air defense systems. According to the Syrian Observatory for Human Rights monitor, at least 14 people were killed and more were wounded. Among the casualties were Iranian citizens.

The Syrian military reported that rockets had struck several bases in the Hama and Aleppo countryside on April 29, 2018. An opposition source said one of the locations hit was the 'Brigade 47' army base near Hama city, widely known as a recruitment center for Iranian-backed Shiite militias fighting alongside Assad forces. The Syrian opposition stated that 38 regime soldiers were killed and 57 were injured. Unconfirmed reports stated that among the casualties was an Iranian general.

According to Syrian media, on 8 May 2018, Israeli warplanes struck several military bases in Syria where there is significant Iranian presence. Two Israeli missiles that were targeting a weapons convoy at a base were downed near the al-Kiswah industrial zones close to Damascus.

On May 18, massive explosions hit the Hama Military Airport. Sky News Arabia reported that it was caused by targeted strikes against an Iranian Bavar 373 long-range missile defense system that was put into service in March 2017. The Baghdad Post reported that Israeli jets targeted the IRGC positions at the airport and that the shelling came shortly after hitting positions of the Iraqi militias who gathered there. Debkafile reported dozens of Syrian and Iranians killed in the blasts.

On May 24, Syrian witnesses claimed that warplanes flying from Lebanese airspace conducted a strike near an airport in Homs, following earlier reports of Israeli aircraft being seen above Lebanon. According to the Syrian Al-Marsad organization for human rights, the attack was aimed at a Hezbollah base. Twenty one people were reportedly killed in the strike, including nine Iranians.

According to Kuwaiti newspaper Al-Jarida, Israel struck Iraqi Shiite militants in Syria with the approval of both Russia and the United States on June 18, killing 52. Syrian official news agency SANA reported that two Israeli missiles struck near Damascus International Airport on June 26. Local activists claimed that Israeli warplanes targeted an Iranian cargo plane that was being unloaded at the airport. UK-Based Syrian Observatory for Human Rights said that the Israeli missiles hit arms depots for Hezbollah near the airport and Syrian air defense systems failed to prevent the Israeli strikes.

According to the Syrian opposition, an Israeli airstrike destroyed ammunition warehouses belonging to the Assad regime and pro-Assad militias in the Deraa district of southern Syria on July 3. Syrian State TV reported on July 8 that Israeli aircraft targeted the T-4 air base near Homs, and Syrian air defense systems shot down a number of incoming missiles. While Syrian state media did not report any casualties, the Syrian opposition stated nine people were killed in the strikes. Citing Arab media sources, Al Jazeera claimed between four and six rockets hit the base and its surroundings. Syrian media reported that on July 15 Israel attacked the Nayrab military airport outside Aleppo. In the past Al-Nayrab has been linked to Iranian forces. On July 22, Syrian state television reported that an Israeli airstrike hit a military site in the city of Misyaf in the Hama province, causing only material damage. An intelligence source assessed that a military research center for chemical arms production was located near the city.

Large explosions were reported at a Syrian military air base near Damascus on 2 September 2018 in a strike widely attributed to Israeli warplanes. However, Syria denied an attack had taken place, saying the blasts were caused by an explosion at an ammunitions dump provoked by electrical malfunctions.

Syrian state media reported that Israeli aircraft attacked Iranian positions in the city of Hama on September 4, 2018, killing at least one person and injuring twelve others. According to a military source, Syrian air defenses intercepted several missiles over the nearby town of Wadi al-Uyun. Additional strikes were reported in Baniyas as well. Israel revealed that its forces have carried out more than 200 airstrikes against Iranian targets in Syria and fired over 800 missiles and mortar shells over the past year and a half, causing an interrumption of Iran's arms smuggling and the evacuation of several Iranian bases in Syria. Israel allegedly targeted Damascus airport on September 15, destroying a weapons depot with newly-arrived arms for Hezbollah or the Iranian military. Syrian state media claimed Israeli missiles were intercepted.

Israeli missiles reportedly targeted sites belonging to Iranian-backed militias in al-Kiswah on November 29, 2018. Fragments of a Syrian anti-aircraft missile were found in an open area in Israel's side of the Golan Heights several hours after Syrian media said it had downed "hostile targets" over the southern part of the country the previous night. Israeli military sources denied any plane was shot down.

The Syrian Observatory for Human Rights reported that on January 12, 2019, Israeli aircraft attacked missile depots belonging to Hezbollah in the al-Kiwash area and the Damascus international airport. Israeli Prime Minister Netanyahu said "Only in the last 36 hours did the air force strike targets in Syria and we have proven that we will stop the settlement of Iran in Syria."

Local Syrian media and Syrian opposition sources reported that on January 20, 2019, Israeli missiles were fired at Damascus International Airport and the town of al-Kiswah. The Syrian military claimed nine missiles were intercepted by its air defenses. IDF reported that the Iron Dome system intercepted an incoming projectile from Syria, which was heading toward the northern Golan Heights. Israel retaliated by attacking Iranian targets near Damascus and Syrian air defense batteries that fired upon the attacking Israeli jets. The Syrian Observatory for Human Rights said 21 people died in the strikes, including 12 Iranian fighters.

== See also ==
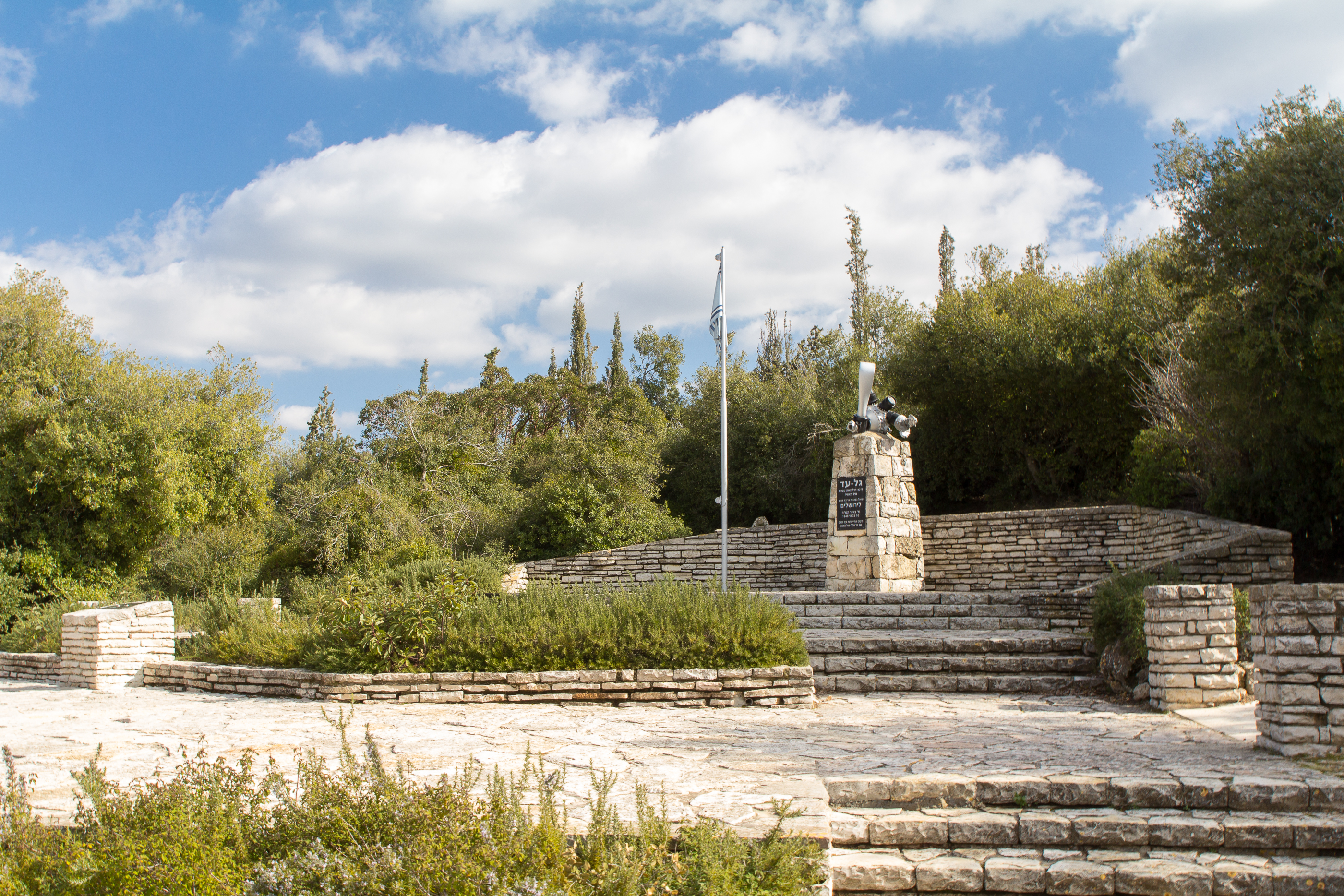
Har Hatayasim (Pilots' Mountain) near Jerusalem is the official IAF memorial to its fallen. It contains the remains of a Noorduyn Norseman which crashed in the area during Operation Maccabi on May 10, 1948

- Palavir
- Palestine Airways
- Lists of flying aces in Arab–Israeli wars
- History of the Israel Defense Forces
- Military operations conducted by the Israeli Defense Forces
- Post–World War II air-to-air combat losses
- Rotem Crisis
