= Ashrafiyat al-Wadi =

Ashrafiyat al-Wadi أشرفية الوادي
- Village
- Location within Syria
- Coordinates: 33.586734°N 36.193068°E
- Country: Syria
- Governorate: Rif Dimashq
- District: Qudsaya
- Subdistrict: Qudsaya

Population (2004 census)
  - Total: 2,101
- Time zone: UTC+2 (EET)
  - Summer (DST): UTC+3 (EEST)

Ashrafiyat al-Wadi (Arabic: أشرفية الوادي) is a village adjacent to the town of Qudsaya and just north of the Mezzeh district of Damascus in Syria. The village is administratively part of the Qudsaya District of the Rif Dimashq Governorate in southern Syria. Nearby localities include al-Hamah to the east, the affluent suburbs of al-Sabboura and Yaafour to the west and Dahiyat Qudsaya and Jdeidat al-Wadi to the south. According to the Syria Central Bureau of Statistics, Ashrafiyat al-Wadi had a population of 2,101 in the 2004 census. Its inhabitants are predominantly Sunni Muslims.

== History ==
In 1838, Eli Smith noted that Ashrafiyat al-Wadi‘s population was Sunni Muslim.

== Bibliography ==
- Robinson, E.; Smith, E. (1841). Biblical Researches in Palestine, Mount Sinai and Arabia Petraea: A Journal of Travels in the year 1838. Vol. 3. Boston: Crocker & Brewster.
