= Jamraya =

Jamraya جمرايا
- Village
- Location within Syria
- Coordinates: 33.56°N 36.217°E
- Country: Syria
- Governorate: Rif Dimashq
- District: Qudsaya
- Subdistrict: Qudsaya

Population (2004 census)
  - Total: 1,156
- Time zone: UTC+2 (EET)
  - Summer (DST): UTC+3 (EEST)

Jamraya or Jemraya (Arabic: جمرايا) is a village in the Qudsaya District of Rif Dimashq (Damascus Countryside) in southern Syria. It lies 3 miles (5 km) to the northwest of the Syrian capital of Damascus city, beyond Mount Qasioun, and is now an outlying suburb of greater Damascus. It is between al-Hamah and Qudsaya town to the south, and Ashrafiyat al-Wadi to the north. It is about 10 miles (15 km) from the Lebanese border. According to the Syria Central Bureau of Statistics, the village had a population of 1,156 in the 2004 census.

== Military facilities ==
A military research facility of the Syrian Scientific Studies and Research Center is located in Jamraya; weapons are developed and stored here, and the site has been accused of developing chemical weapons. The highly secretive military facility was established in the 1980s, when Syria was a Soviet ally.

A parking lot at the research center was the site of a January 31, 2013 Israeli airstrike on missiles parked there. Another Israeli attack on May 5, 2013 destroyed buildings located in a chicken farm a mile from the research center. An Israeli airstrike on January 12, 2019 damaged a suspected Iranian target in a Syrian military base 1.5 km west of the research center.
