= May 2013 Rif Dimashq airstrikes =

- Part of Hezbollah involvement in the Syrian civil war and the Iran–Israel conflict during the Syrian civil war
- Rif Dimashq Governorate in Syria (red)
- Planned by: Israel (allegedly)
- Objective: Destroy a munitions depot, stop transfer of weapons to Hezbollah
- Date: 3 May 2013 and 5 May 2013
- Executed by: Israeli Air Force involvement alleged
- Outcome: unknown
- Casualties: 42+ soldiers dead (SOHR claim), and many civilian casualties (Syrian government claim)

The May 2013 Rif Dimashq airstrikes were a series of aerial attacks made on targets in Syria on 3 and 5 May 2013. The 3 May attack was on targets at Damascus International Airport. The 5 May attacks were on targets at Jamraya, and the Al-Dimas and Maysalun areas in Rif Dimashq (Damascus Countryside). Although officially Israel neither confirmed nor denied its involvement, former Mossad director Danny Yatom and former government member Tzachi Hanegbi inferred Israel's involvement in the attack. Official Syrian sources denied any attack on its soil on 3 May, but did accuse Israel for the attacks on 5 May.

== Timeline ==
Early on 3 May 2013, several unidentified warplanes attacked a warehouse in Damascus International Airport that contained advanced surface-to-surface missiles that allegedly had been transported from Iran and were possibly bound for Hezbollah militants in Lebanon. The warehouse was believed to be controlled by Hezbollah and Iran's Quds Force. An unidentified American official said the missiles were Fateh-110s and two Israeli defense analysts said they included Scud Ds. Satellite images showed that two facilities on opposite sides of the airport were destroyed.

In the early hours of 5 May there were further air strikes on Syria. SANA, the Syrian state news agency, said there were strikes in three places: northeast of Jamraya; the Al-Dimas air base; and at Maysalun on the border with Lebanon. Syria suggested it had been attacked with rockets.

== Targets of the attack ==
Photographs handed out by SANA and video shown on Al-Manar, a Lebanese television station affiliated with Hezbollah, showed buildings destroyed by the attack on the western side of Mount Qasioun at Al-Hamah, near Jamraya, in what appeared to be a chicken farm. Analysis by Storyful identified the location, which was a mile from the Syrian Scientific Studies and Research Center (SSRC) facility at Jamraya where a 31 January 2013 airstrike destroyed a convoy in the parking lot. The same location was identified by Giuliano Ranieri. The location is at 33°33′49.3″N 36°15′1″E. Storyful identified this location as the site of the largest explosion in the Jamraya and Qasioun area that night. Al-Manar said the SSRC facility was not hit on this occasion and Storyful also said there was no evidence of a strike at the SSRC facility.

Syrian officials said that a paragliding airport in the Al-Dimas area of Damascus was also hit.

The Syrian Observatory for Human Rights said the air raids had killed at least 42 soldiers and another 100 were missing. Other opposition sources put the death toll at 300. A doctor at Tishreen military hospital in north Damascus said that 100 soldiers were killed in the attack.

== Reactions ==
- Turkey - Turkish Prime Minister Tayyip Erdogan commented that attacking other countries was "unacceptable".
- Iran - The Iranian Minister of Foreign Affairs, Ali Akbar Salehi, warned of grave consequences for the Middle East if the Assad government should fall.
- Lebanon - The President of Lebanon, Michel Suleiman suggested that launching weapons at other sovereign states was breaking international law.
- Syria - On 7 May, Syrian President Bashar al-Assad characterized Israel's actions as "an act of terrorism". Assad added that the airstrikes "revealed the extent" of the Israeli and Western involvement in the ongoing civil war. Assad also stated that the Syrian people and its army are prepared to confront Israeli, and other, ventures targeting Syria.
- United Nations - UN Secretary-General Ban Ki-moon expressed "grave concern" over the airstrikes and appealed for restraint to avoid an escalation in Syrian civil war.
- United States - United States President Barack Obama did not comment on the airstrike, but stated "The Israelis, justifiably, have to guard against the transfer of advanced weaponry to terrorist organizations like Hezbollah".
- United Kingdom - British Foreign Secretary William Hague commented that "All countries have to look after their own national security, of course, and are able to take actions to protect their own national security" and said that Israel has the right to defend itself.
- Israel - Israeli politician Tzachi Hanegbi made it clear that any action was against Hezbollah, not against the Assad government, without explicitly admitting Israel made the strikes.
- Egypt - Egypt's President Mohammad Morsi's pointed out to Israel that attacking other countries was "increasing complexities".
- Russia - Russia expressed "deep concern" about the offensive and warned not to create an anti-Syrian media circus.

== See also ==
- January 2013 Rif Dimashq airstrike
- April 2015 Qalamoun incident
