= Ayoub Mansour =

- Born: 1938; Al-Sabboura, Hama
- Died: 2008 (aged 69–70)
- Known for: Writing stories and novels

Ayoub Mansour (Arabic: أيوب منصور; 1938 - 2008) was a Syrian writer, born in the Al-Sabboura district of the city of Salamiyah in Hama Governorate. He was a member of the Story and Novel Society of the Arab Writers Union - Syria. He was educated in Hama, finished primary school in 1901, continued his preparatory studies there, and soon dropped out of school and went to practical life in agriculture and construction. He worked in journalism from 1980 to 1985, wrote poetry, story and novel and was more famous for writing for children.

== Works ==
He has published several literary works, including:

- «Peace in the City of Dreams» (original: Salām fī madīnat al-aḥlām), Ministry of Culture, Damascus, 1977.
- «The Last Rocket» (original: Alsaarukh Al'akheir), The Bath Vanguards Organization, Damascus, 1978.
- «The Sorrows of the grizzly Gazelle» (original: 'Ahzan Alghazal Al'ashhab) Ministry of Culture, Damascus, 1979.
- «Tears of Old Horses» (original: Dumue Aljiad Alharima) Ministry of Culture, Damascus, 1986.
- «Confessions of Sihal Dhaylih» (original: Ai'etirafat Sihal Dhaylih), Dar Alhaqayiq, Beirut, 1986.
- «The most beautiful thing in the world» (original: 'Ajmal ma fi aldunya), the Military Housing Corporation, Damascus, 1989.
- «The Pirate and the Wind» (original: Alqursan w Alriyh) Ministry of Culture, Damascus, 1990.
- «The Little Princess» (original: Al-Amira Al-saghira), Dar Al-Fata Al-Arabi, Beirut 1975.
- «Beautiful Feathers» (original: Al-rish Al-jamil), Dar Al-Fata Al-Arabi, Beirut, 1975.
- «The Morning Star: Stories for Children» (original: Naǧmaẗ Al-ṣubḥ: qiṣaṣ lil aṭfāl) Ministry of Culture, Damascus, 1976.
- «Grandfather Ayoub's Tales» (original: Hikayat Aljid 'Ayoub), Arab Writers Union, Damascus, 1977.
- «The Old Man and the Fox» (original: Aleajuz wa altha'lab), Dar Al-Mutanabbi for Children and Young People, Damascus, 1989
- «The Rabbit Who Forgot Himself» (original: Al-arnab aladhi nasi nafsah), Al-Mutanabbi House for Children and Young People, Damascus, 1989.
- «What did the bee say» (original: Madha qalat alnahla), Al-Mutanabbi House for Children and Young People, Damascus, 1989.
- «The Blue Fig» (original: Altiyn al'azraq), Al-Mutanabbi House for Children and Young People, Damascus, 1989.
- «Zainab's Dreams» (original: 'Ahlam Zainab), Dar Al-Mutanabbi for Children and Young People, Damascus, 1989.
- «Ayoub», Zajlia Group, Military Housing Corporation, Damascus, 1994.
- «The Promise, or Nile and the Morning Star» (original: Alw'ad, 'aw nayil wa najmat al-sabah), a heritage novel, about the Ministry of Culture in 1995.
- «The Paths of Paradise» (original: Durub Alfirdaws), a novel, on the authority of the Ministry of Culture, 1998.
- «The Eagle and the Amber» (original: Alnasr wa Ale'anbar), a story, Dar Al-Mutanabi for printing, publishing and distribution, Damascus, 1996.
- «Ayoub Songs of Sand and Soil» (original:'Ayoub 'Anashid lilraml walturab), 1994.

=== Works translated into English ===
The peacock with the beautiful feathers, translated by: Denys Johnson Davies.
