= Dahiyat Qudsaya =

Dahiyat Qudsaya ضاحية قدسيا السكنية الجديدة
- Village
- Location within Syria
- Coordinates: 33°32′25″N 36°11′35″E
- Country: Syria
- Governorate: Rif Dimashq Governorate
- District: Qudsaya District
- Nahiyah: Qudsaya

Population (2004 census)
  - Total: 9,500
- Time zone: UTC+2 (EET)
  - Summer (DST): UTC+3 (EEST)

Dahiyat Qudsaya (Arabic: ضاحية قدسيا السكنية الجديدة, lit. 'Qudsaya Modern Residential Suburb') is a modern suburb adjacent to the town of Qudsaya and just north of the Mezzeh district of Damascus in Syria. The village is administratively part of the Qudsaya District of the Rif Dimashq Governorate in southern Syria. Nearby localities include al-Hamah to the north, and the affluent suburbs of al-Sabboura and Yaafour to the west. According to the Syria Central Bureau of Statistics, Dahiyat Qudsaya had a population of 9,500 in the 2004 census.
