= Qudsaya District =

Qudsaya District منطقة قدسيا
- District
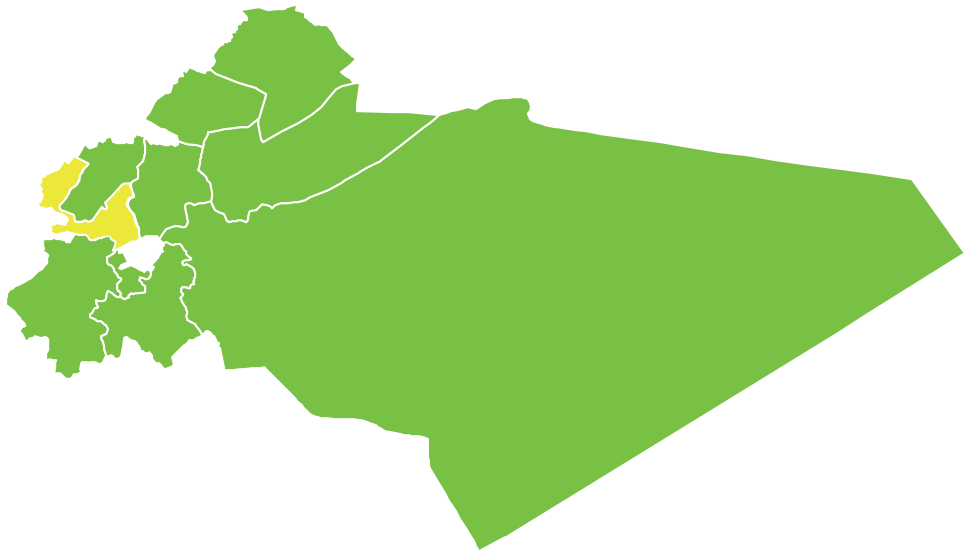
- Map of Qudsaya District within Rif Dimashq Governorate
- Coordinates (Qudsaya): 33.53°N 36.22°E
- Country: Syria
- Governorate: Rif Dimashq
- Established: 2009
- Seat: Qudsaya
- Subdistricts: 3 nawāḥī

Area
  - Total: 321.64 km^{2} (124.19 sq mi)

Population (2004)
  - Total: 105,974
  - Density: 329.48/km^{2} (853.35/sq mi)
- Geocode: SY0310

Qudsaya District (Arabic: منطقة قدسيا, romanized: manṭiqat Qudsaya) is a district of the Rif Dimashq Governorate in southern Syria.

Qudsaya District is located to the northwest of the Damascus Governorate and Mount Qasioun, covering the northwestern outskirts of metropolitan Damascus. The administrative centre is the town of Qudsaya.

Until 2009, Qudsaya was a sub-district within Markaz Rif Dimashq District. In February 2009, the district of Qudsaya was formed, combining the former sub-district of Qudsaya with two sub-districts from the Zabadani District. At the 2004 census, these subdistricts had a total population of 105,974 people.

== Sub-districts ==
The district of Qudsaya is divided into three sub-districts or nawāḥī. Population figures in the table are as of 2004.

Subdistricts of Qudsaya District
Code	Name	Area	Population
SY031000	Qudsaya Subdistrict	59.86 km^{2}	64,412
SY031001	Al-Dimas Subdistrict	159.51 km^{2}	21,978
SY031002	Ain al-Fijah Subdistrict	102.27 km^{2}	19,584

== Localities ==
According to the Central Bureau of Statistics (CBS), the villages, towns and cities in the following table make up the district of Qudsaya.

English Name	Arabic Name	Population	Subdistrict
Qudsaya	قدسيا	33,571	Qudsaya
al-Dimas	الديماس	14,574	Al-Dimas
al-Hamah	الهامة	10,045	Qudsaya
Dahiyat Qudsaya	ضاحية قدسيا	9,500	Qudsaya
Jdeidat al-Wadi	جديدة الوادي	5,227	Qudsaya
Deir Muqaran	دير مقرن	4,803	Ain al-Fijah
Deir Qanun	دير قانون	4,213	Ain al-Fijah
Kfeir al-Zayt	كفير الزيت	4,170	Ain al-Fijah
Ain al-Fijah	عين الفيجة	3,806	Ain al-Fijah
Kfeir Yabous	كفير يابوس	3,801	Al-Dimas
Basimah	بسيمة	2,812	Qudsaya
Ashrafiyat al-Wadi	أشرفية الوادي	2,101	Qudsaya
al-Husseiniyah	الحسينية	1,563	Ain al-Fijah
Jamraya	جمرايا	1,156	Qudsaya
Mazraat Deir al-Ashayer	مزرعة دير العشائر	1,107	Al-Dimas
Qura al-Sham	قرى الأسد	1,067	Al-Dimas
Efra	افرة	1,029	Ain al-Fijah
Jdeidat Yabous	جديدة يابوس	994	Al-Dimas
Yabous	يابوس	369	Al-Dimas
Maadar	معدر	66	Al-Dimas
