= Maadar =

Maadar معدر
- Village
- Location in Syria
- Coordinates: 33°45′N 36°01′E
- Country: Syria
- Governorate: Rif Dimashq Governorate
- District: Qudsaya District
- Nahiyah: Al-Dimas

Population (2004 census)
  - Total: 66
- Time zone: UTC+2 (EET)
  - Summer (DST): UTC+3 (EEST)

Maadar (Arabic: معدر) is a Syrian village in the Qudsaya District of the Rif Dimashq Governorate. According to the Syria Central Bureau of Statistics (CBS), Maadar had a population of 66 in the 2004 census.
