= Kfeir Yabous =

Village in Syria

Kfeir Yabous كفير يابوس
- Village
- Location in Syria
- Coordinates: 33°41′23″N 35°59′51″E
- Country: Syria
- Governorate: Rif Dimashq Governorate
- District: Qudsaya District
- Nahiyah: Al-Dimas

Population (2004 census)
  - Total: 3,801
- Time zone: UTC+2 (EET)
  - Summer (DST): UTC+3 (EEST)

Kfeir Yabous (Arabic: كفير يابوس) is a Syrian village in the Qudsaya District of the Rif Dimashq Governorate. According to the Syria Central Bureau of Statistics (CBS), Kfeir Yabous had a population of 3,801 in the 2004 census.
