= Yabous, Syria =

Yabous يابوس
- Village
- Location in Syria
- Coordinates: 33°40′N 36°00′E
- Country: Syria
- Governorate: Rif Dimashq Governorate
- District: Qudsaya District
- Nahiyah: Al-Dimas

Population (2004 census)
  - Total: 369
- Time zone: UTC+2 (EET)
  - Summer (DST): UTC+3 (EEST)

Yabous (Arabic: يابوس) is a Syrian village in the Qudsaya District of the Rif Dimashq Governorate. According to the Syria Central Bureau of Statistics (CBS), Yabous had a population of 369 in the 2004 census.
