= Qura al-Sham =

Qura al-Sham قرى الشام
- Village
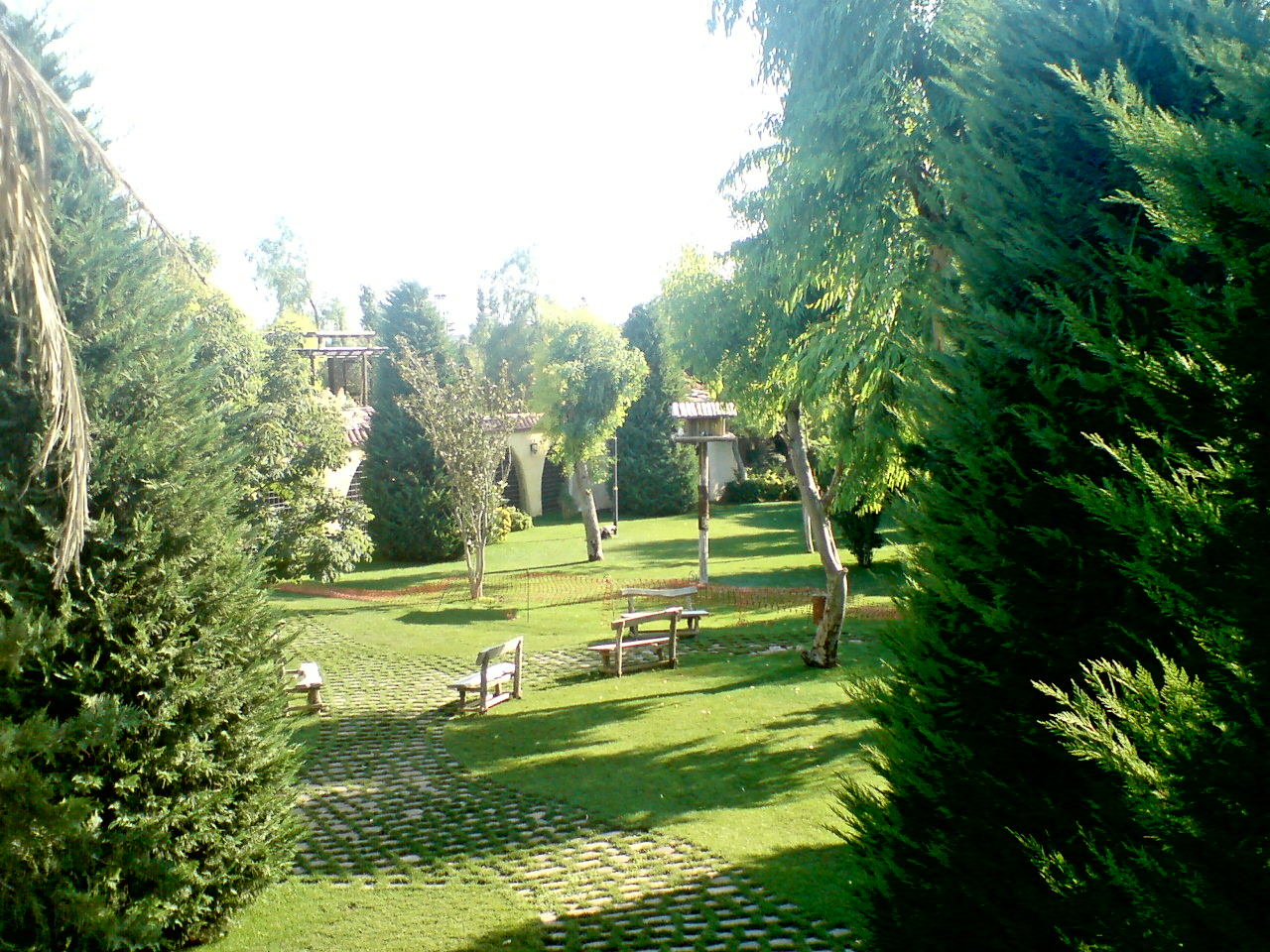
- Hamsho Park, Qura al-Sham.
- Interactive map of Qura al-Sham
- Location in Syria Qura al-Sham (Eastern Mediterranean) Qura al-Sham (Asia)
- Coordinates: 33°33′28″N 36°08′00″E
- Country: Syria
- Governorate: Rif Dimashq Governorate
- District: Qudsaya District
- Nahiyah: Al-Dimas

Population (2004 census)
  - Total: 1,067
- Time zone: UTC+2 (EET)
  - Summer (DST): UTC+3 (EEST)

Qura al-Sham (Arabic: قرى الشام, romanized: Qurā al-Shām) is a Syrian village in the Qudsaya District of the Rif Dimashq Governorate. According to the Syria Central Bureau of Statistics (CBS), Qura al-Sham had a population of 1,067 in the 2004 census.

Until 2024, the village was known as Qura al-Assad (Arabic: قرى الأسد).
