= January 2013 Rif Dimashq airstrike =

Event during the Iran–Israel proxy conflict

Coordinates: 33°34′20.70″N 36°14′27″E

- Part of Hezbollah involvement in the Syrian civil war, and the Iran–Israel conflict during the Syrian civil war
- Rif Dimashq Governorate in Syria (red)
- Objective: Destroy a weapons convoy carrying Soviet/Russian-made SA-17 anti-aircraft missiles to Hezbollah
- Date: 31 January 2013
- Executed by: Israeli Air Force (alleged)
- Outcome: Destruction of anti-aircraft missiles destined for Hezbollah and collateral damage to nearby research center on biological and chemical weapons
- Casualties: 2 people killed (official Syrian report)

The January 2013 Rif Dimashq airstrike was an aerial attack in the Rif Dimashq Governorate of Syria, which targeted a convoy alleged to be carrying weapons from Syria to the Lebanese Shi'a militia Hezbollah. The convoy was attacked on 31 January 2013. According to several media sources, Israeli forces allegedly conducted the strike; however, Israel has not officially responded to the allegations.

The convoy was attacked while parked at a facility of the Syrian Scientific Studies and Research Center, Syria's main research center on biological and chemical weapons, at Jamraya, several miles northwest of the Syrian capital of Damascus. In addition to Russian-made SA-17 anti-aircraft missiles, secondary explosions from the attacked munitions also damaged a building of the Scientific Studies and Research Center. Satellite images taken a few days after the attack showed a scorched and blackened parking lot at the center, where the arms convoy was apparently hit.

Israel did not officially confirm responsibility for the bombing, but Israeli Defense Minister Ehud Barak suggested that it could have been behind the attack, saying on 3 February, "I cannot add anything to what you've read in the newspapers about what happened in Syria several days ago, but I keep telling, frankly, that we've said – and that's another proof that when we say something we mean it – we say that we don't think that it should be allowable to bring advanced weapon systems into Lebanon."

== Background ==
During the Syrian civil war, Israel feared that the collapse of the Assad regime might prompt a transfer of sophisticated arms, including chemical weapons, to Hezbollah. In addition, the transformation of Syria from an ally to a proxy of Iran could open another front in the Iran–Israel proxy conflict. In 2013, Hezbollah fighters replaced forces of the Syrian Arab Army near the Golan Heights. Israel thereafter began direct intervention in Syria largely aimed as Hezbollah.

Despite the United Nations Security Council Resolution 1701 from 2006 which called for an embargo on arms shipments to Lebanon, Hezbollah has reportedly continued to arm itself with assistance from Iran and Syria. Those weapons include, according to reports, Scud D surface-to-surface missiles originating in North Korea, with a range of 700 kilometres (430 mi). Then-Israeli Prime Minister Ehud Olmert stated in 2008 that Israel would not accept the transfer of advanced, balance-disrupting weapons systems to Hezbollah and would use force if necessary.

== Events ==
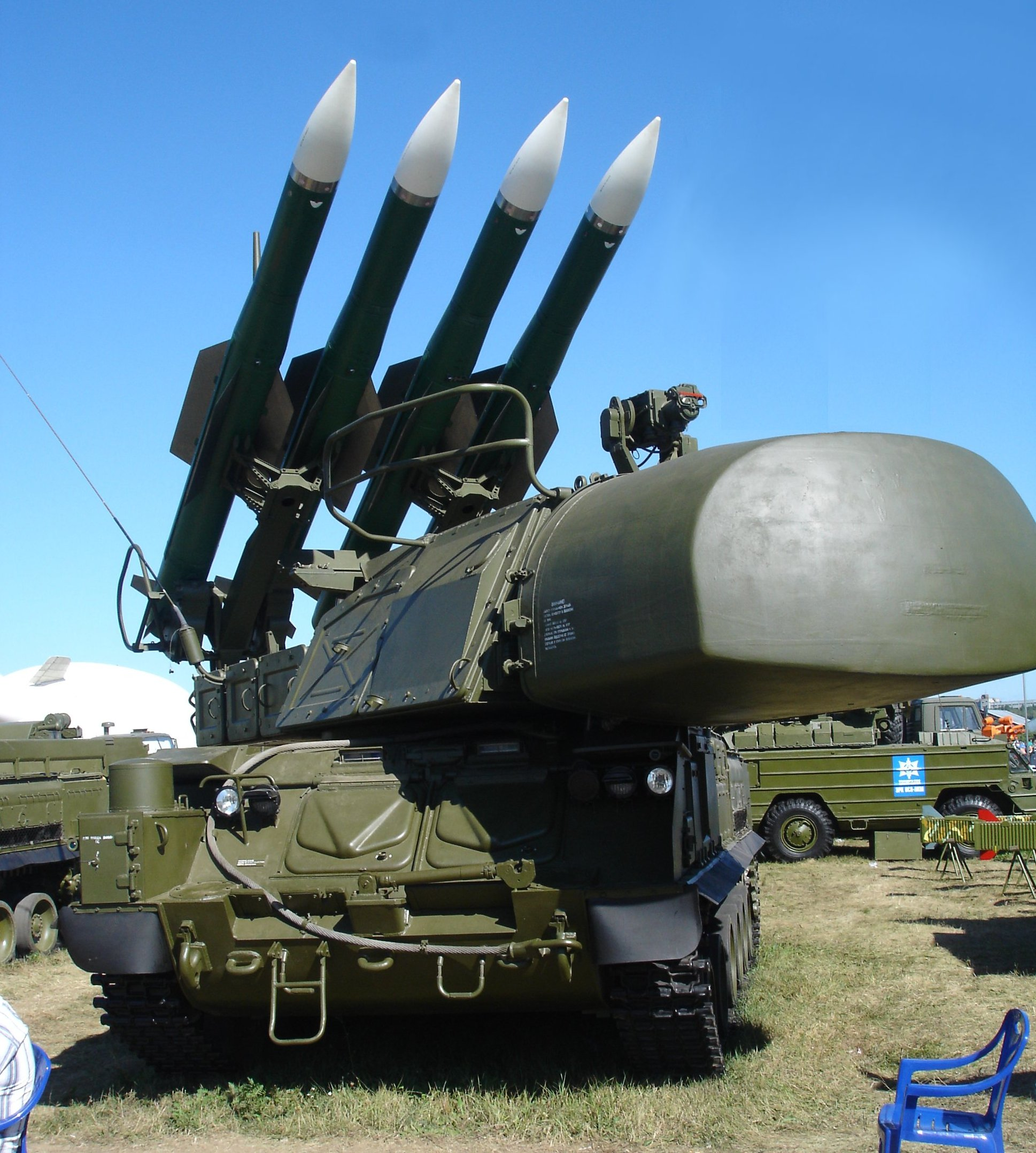
SA-17 surface-to-air missile system, similar to the one allegedly targeted by the attack

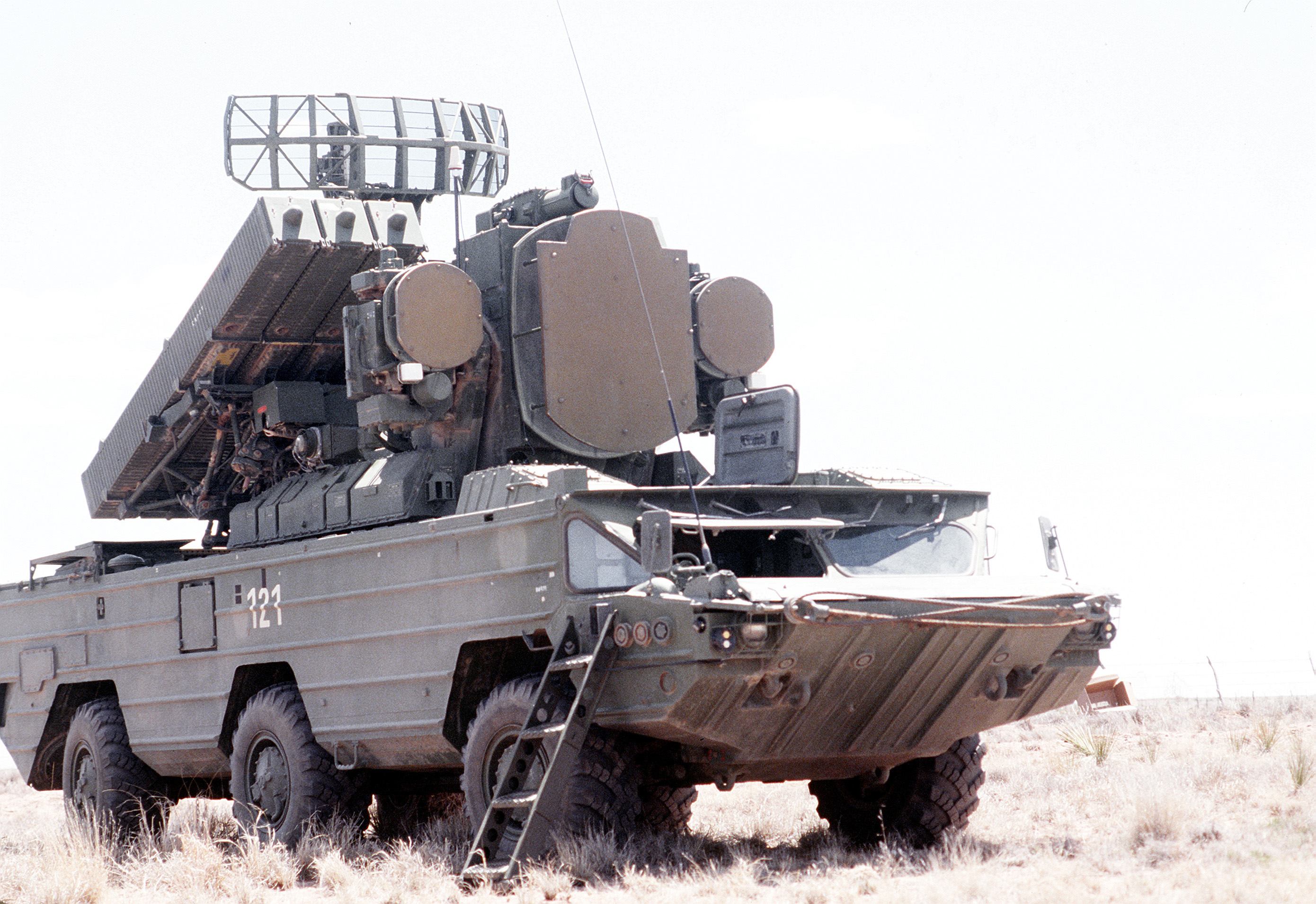
SA-8 surface-to-air missile system, similar to ones shown on a Syrian television footage broadcast

About ten jets, flying from the Mediterranean Sea fired eight missiles at their target, and then flew back over southern Lebanon. The jets were tracked by both NATO and Lebanese radars. Despite initial reports, the planes did not enter Syrian airspace and fired from Lebanese airspace. Israel's newly re-elected Prime Minister Benjamin Netanyahu was reported to have notified the United States and Russia of the impending attack a few days beforehand.

According to the Associated Press, Israel had been planning for days to hit a truck convoy carrying SA-17 anti-aircraft missiles bound for Hezbollah in Lebanon. According to a Free Syrian Army spokesman, Hussam Hush Nawis (also known as Hassan Shateri), a senior commander of Iran's Islamic Revolutionary Guard Corps, who was supervising a shipment of weapons and rockets to Lebanon, was killed in the airstrike, along with several aides.

According to the Syrian government, the airstrike targeted a "scientific research center" at Jamraya, several miles northwest of Damascus. According to a security analyst, Amir Rapaport, footage broadcast on Syrian television showed a damaged armored vehicle that seemed to belong to the SA-8 missile system. He speculated that the vehicle may have been placed on the scene after the attack, because Syria had guaranteed the Russians not to transfer the more advanced SA-17 system to Lebanon.

The airstrike on 31 January was Israel's first airstrike in Syria during the war and the first in Syria since Operation Orchard in 2007, when Israeli jets destroyed an unfinished Syrian nuclear facility.

== Reactions ==
- Israel: Boaz Ganor, director of the International Institute for Counter-Terrorism, warned that if Syria's weapons falls into the hands of jihadist groups like al-Qaeda, that would be a global threat.
- Russia: "If this information is confirmed, then we are dealing with the unprovoked attacks on targets on the territory of a sovereign country, which blatantly violates the UN Charter and is unacceptable, no matter what the motives were to justify it."
- Iran: Minister of foreign affairs Ali Akbar Salehi condemned the alleged airstrike as an "overt assault based on the West's policy" to undermine stability in Syria. "The Zionists got ahead of themselves in trying to cover up the successes of the Syrian government and nation in maintaining the existing government and restoring stability and security". Deputy Foreign Minister Hossein Amir Abdollahian said the raid would have "grave consequences for Tel Aviv".

== Aftermath ==
Additional air strikes in Rif Dimashq in Syria reportedly took place on 3 and 5 May 2013. According to Jerusalem Post, the attacks targeted accurate short-range Fateh-110 surface-to-surface missiles destined for Hezbollah from Iran. Israeli politician Tzachi Hanegbi made a statement to Israel Radio that if any raids were made, those were "only against Hezbollah, not against the Syrian regime" without explicitly admitting Israel made the strikes. The Israeli newspaper Haaretz reported that rebel forces claimed that other targets were destroyed during the strike on the airbase, including fuel and ammunition depots and a cargo plane that had arrived from Iran.

However, according to Abdulkader Saleh, a commander in the Free Syrian Army, opposition forces were about to receive a transfer of weapons with the help of several pro-rebel high ranking Syrian officials when Israel attacked to prevent this from occurring. Saleh stated: "This assault, of course, was intended to support the Assad administration".

According to anonymous US officials, Israel allegedly launched another airstrike on 5 July 2013. It targeted Russian-made Yakhont anti-ship missiles near the city of Latakia and killed several Syrian troops. Hezbollah's Al-Manar claimed that the explosions were caused by "stray mortars" from "local clashes."

== See also ==
- Syria and weapons of mass destruction
