= Timeline of the Syrian civil war (May–December 2013) =

The following is a timeline of the Syrian civil war from May to December 2013. Information about aggregated casualty counts is found at Casualties of the Syrian Civil War.

== May 2013 ==
=== 1 May ===
The Russian Federal Air Transport Agency ordered civilian flights to cease flying over Syrian airspace.

=== 2 May ===
Alleged Bayda and Baniyas massacres commenced; according to a later U.N. report, between 300 and 450 civilians were killed in the two massacres by Syrian forces.

=== 3 May ===
An attack in Rif Dimashq Governorate, when allegedly IAF bombed a suspected weapons site.

=== 4 May ===
Rebels continued their siege on Meng airbase. It was claimed that rebels had killed the base commander in clashes, and also seized the second military detachment of the base. Rebels claimed that a group of pilots defected and assassinated the base's commanding officer. The defected pilots told rebels that around 200 soldiers remained in the base, garrisoned in the headquarters building supported by a handful of tanks. Many soldiers resorted to sleeping under tanks, fearing a rebel assault.

=== 5 May ===
Planes, reportedly of Israeli origin, hit targets just outside Damascus.

=== 8 May ===
The Syrian government is reported to have blacked out all internet traffic into and out of Syria. Syria "has largely disappeared from the Internet". A similar event took place in November of last year.

Syrian Internet services were restored after a 19-hour blackout.

=== 9 May ===
The Philippines is strongly considering withdrawing its 342 peacekeepers stationed in the Golan Heights after four of its peacekeepers were kidnapped by rebel forces.

=== 10 May ===
3 Lebanese nationals were killed in fighting in Syria, a further 36 have been reported missing. How they were killed and whom they were fighting for remains unclear.

Rebel fighters managed to cut off the strategic road to Halab al-Jadida, that was the main supply line for the Syrian army between Hama and Aleppo. This happened through taking over the 2 checkpoints of al-Qebtein and Um Amud.

=== 11 May ===
Rebels managed to cut a newly build desert road used as an Army supply route between central Syria and Aleppo's airport.

=== 12 May ===
The Syrian army took control of Khirbet Ghazaleh, Daraa.

An explosion in the Syrian-Turkish border town of Reyhanli killed 46 and wounded 155 Turkish citizens.

=== 13 May ===
The Syrian army captured the towns of Western Dumayna, Haidariyeh and Esh al-Warwar, near Qusayr.

A Turkish F-16 on an operational mission crashed near the border with Syria. Locals in the village of Yarpuz on the Turkish side of the border reported a loud explosion.

=== 15 May ===
The United Nations updated their estimated death toll of the entire conflict to 80,000.

The United Nations General Assembly passed a resolution (GA/11372) adopting a "Text Condemning Violence in Syria, Demanding That All Sides End Hostilities". The resolution passed the General Assembly by a vote of 107 in favor to 12 against, with 59 abstentions.

The twelve countries voting against the resolution were Belarus, Bolivia, China, Cuba, Democratic People’s Republic of Korea, Ecuador, Iran, Nicaragua, Russian Federation, Syria, Venezuela and Zimbabwe. Most of these countries, known in some circles as the "Gang of Twelve", are noteworthy for their current or past Communist or Communist influenced governments (in the case of Belarus, China, Cuba, North Korea, Nicaragua, Russia and Venezuela) and/or record of human rights violations (as in the case of Iran, Syria and Zimbabwe).

There has been, apparently, a conscious effort to suppress information regarding this resolution as it is difficult to find information concerning it on the Internet.

=== 16 May ===
The Syrian army repelled a large rebel assault on an Aleppo prison. The attack was aimed at dislodging government forces and freeing an estimated 4,000 political prisoners are being held there, however the rebels were forced to retreat after airstrikes caused casualties among their ranks. Rebels blew open the prison's main-gate, and took control of a building.

Rebels besieged the 52 Brigade in Daraa. Rebels also claimed they recaptured the town of Qaysa, Rif Damascus, after launching a unified counter-offensive. Rebels also launched an attack on the Brigade 52 base in Daraa province.

By the end of the day 110 people were reported killed by the Syrian army with 60 were reported killed in Damascus and its suburbs.

=== 17 May ===
The Russian navy has expanded their use of their naval base at the Syrian port of Tartus. Previously Russian ships only periodically visited the port, however in the last three months an average 10-15 ships have been reported as having been positioned near the port "at all times".

Rebels captured four villages in Eastern Hama, including the Alawite town of Tulaysiah. The villages were abandoned by its residents days before the rebels arrived.

The Human Rights Watch released a report about the government's mass-torture centers in Raqqa, which were previously accessible until Rebels captured the city.

=== 18 May ===
Rebels took control of the villages of al-Tleysiya, al-Zughba, al-She'ta and Balil in East Hama.

The father of Deputy Foreign Minister Faisal Mekdad has been kidnapped, based on past tactics, by rebel forces his home in Ghossom. In the Syrian-Lebanese border town of Qusayr rebels claimed to have killed at least 10 Hezbollah fighters in an ambush.

=== 19 May ===
Heavy fighting is reported in Qusayr, Syria, as the Syrian army launches a major offensive against rebel forces.

=== 20 May ===
Deliberate gunfire from the Syrian-controlled side of the Golan Heights struck an Israeli patrol vehicle, Israeli soldiers returned fire, destroying the Syrian fire position.

Elite Hezbollah reinforcements were sent from Lebanon across the border to al-Qusayr. Activists reported that much of the town had been destroyed by this point.

=== 22 May ===
US Senate panel backs arming Syrian rebels.

In fighting at Nayrab rebels have seized an army base and several army checkpoints, killing 40 Syrian soldiers and pro-government militiamen in the process with the loss of 14 rebels.

=== 23 May ===
A former government scientist claims that the Syrian government is using diluted chemical weapons, such as with alcohol, on rebels to slow their advance while reducing the number of casualties, leaving open the question as to whether it was military grade tear gas or nerve gas that was used in these attacks thus avoiding the U.S. "red line" on chemical weapons. Amongst the areas were the weapon were alleged to be used are certain suburbs of Damascus, Aleppo’s Sheikh Maksoud district, Saraqeb and Homs. The scientist, who worked for Centre for Scientific Studies and Research, claims that the alleged gas attack on Khan al-Assa, Aleppo, on 19 March 2013, was likely tear gas and not nerve gas.

=== 26 May ===
On 26 May 2013, two rockets hit a Hezbollah area of Beirut injuring five people whilst another two rockets caused property damage to buildings in the al-Hermel district of Beirut. Syrian rebels have been blamed for the attack as they had promised to attack Hezbollah targets in Lebanon in retaliation for their helping the Syrian army particularly in the border town of Al-Qusayr. Syrian rebels have also shelled al-Hermel previously.

=== 27 May ===
Fighting between Kurdish (YPG/PYD) and Liwa al-Tawhid forces in the Ras al-Ayn village near the border with Turkey left 11 dead and 20 wounded.

The United Nations Relief and Works Agency for Palestine Refugees (UNRWA) reports a large explosion in Sbeineh Camp, Damascus Governorate, on 27 May 2013. Early reports suggested that the explosion was caused by a ground-to-ground missile or airstrike. The attack claimed the lives of at least five Palestine refugees. A further eight were wounded and dozens of refugee homes were reportedly destroyed.

=== 28 May ===
LCC reports 112 people were killed by the end of the day. 35 were killed in the Damascus suburbs.

=== 29 May ===
LCC reported 161 people killed that day, including 12 women, 8 children, and 5 under torture. 53 were killed in the Latakia province.

=== 30 May ===
A Syrian army general in March asked Rosoboronexport for a quote on a large number of military items "in the shortest possible time." These items included 20,000 Ak-47s, night vision equipment, 40 mm grenade launchers and some 15,000,000 rounds of AK-47 ammunition. In relation to arms sales to the Assad government Deputy Foreign Minister Sergei Ryabkov stated that Russian arms, such as the S-300 surface-to-air missile, may actually "help restrain some 'hotheads' considering a scenario to give an international dimension to this conflict,"

=== 31 May ===
The Syrian army attacked a convoy trying to remove injured people from the town (according to activists), killing at least 7. Local people report that 15,000 civilians remained trapped in the town with food and water running low. Civilians had to wait 3–4 days for drinking water.

LCC reports of 163 people killed by the Syrian army, including 66 in Aleppo, mostly in a prison massacre.

== June 2013 ==
=== 12 June ===
At least 14 killed in double suicide attack in Damascus. Syrian helicopter fires on Lebanese town of Arsal.

=== 14 June ===
US Government confirms that government forces used chemical weapons in Syria killing up to 150 people and announces increased "military support" to rebels as well as considering a limited no fly zone.

=== 23 June ===
The Syrian Army captured the rebel stronghold town of Talkalakh. Following the assault, 39 local leaders of the Free Syrian Army surrendered and handed over their weapons. The Syrian opposition denied the town had fallen and claimed there was still fighting ongoing however reporters on the ground said there was no sign of it.

== July 2013 ==
=== 5 July ===
On 5 July 2013, an explosion occurred in Latakia port city either as an alleged result of an Israel Defense Forces strike against targets believed to contain Yakhont anti-ship cruise missiles supplied to the Syrian government of Bashar al-Assad by Russia, or a result of mortar fire exchanges in the area. CNN reported that the strike was carried out by the Israeli Air Force, while the Sunday Times reported that the explosions were the result of a cruise missile fired from a Dolphin-class submarine. The blasts occurred at a military complex in the town of Samiyah, near Latakia. On 13 July 2013, United States officials said that Israel carried out an air attack that targeted advanced anti-ship cruise missiles sold to the Syrian government by Russia. Their conclusion was based on intelligence reports. The FSA speculated that "enemy aircraft" were responsible, while Hezbollah's Al-Manar claimed that the explosions were caused by "stray mortars" from "local clashes." Israeli media later reported that the attack had been carried out by cruise missiles launched from a submarine.

=== 11 July ===
Abu Bassir Al Ladkani, a top commander of the Free Syrian Army (FSA), was assassinated. The assassination was carried out by al Qaeda-linked militants.

== August 2013 ==
=== 3–5 August ===
Islamist rebels kill at least 200 people during a three-day assault on Alawite villages in Latakia province. According to a local cleric, at least 100 of the victims were civilians, most of them women and children. A catholic nun said that the number of civilian casualties could be as high as 400-500 and many of them were mutilated, beheaded or dismembered alive. Also, kidnapping of other 150 civilians has been reported.

=== 6 August ===
Syrian rebels captured the Menagh Military Airport, situated on the road between Aleppo and the Turkish city of Gaziantep, after a one-year-long siege. This capture marks an important symbolic victory for the opposition, following a string of defeats to President Assad's forces in central Syria and it consolidates the rebels' hold on a key supply route north of Aleppo.

=== 14 August ===
The Syrian Observatory for Human Rights reported that Paolo Dall'Oglio, a Jesuit priest and missionary who had earlier been abducted by the ISIL, was killed in the rebel-held city of Ar-Raqqah.

=== 21 August ===
Syrian activists reported that Assad forces struck Jobar, Zamalka, 'Ain Tirma, and Hazzah in the Eastern Ghouta region with chemical weapons. Activists at the Syrian Revolutionary Command Council said that at least 635 were killed in a nerve gas attack. Unverified videos uploaded showed the victims, many of whom were convulsing, as well as several dozen bodies lined up. Other sources reported a figure of 213 in a poisonous gas attack. The SNC chief said that the overall death toll stood at an estimated 1300, as only a fraction of the bodies could be collected and many died within their own homes.

=== 24 August ===
Rebel forces took full control of Ariha In Idlib Province.

=== 26 August ===
The United Kingdom and the United States deployed ships near Syria amidst a United Nations investigation concerning allegations that Syrian president al-Assad used chemical weapons against civilians. The following ships were deployed: HMS Bulwark, HMS Illustrious, USS Barry, USS Gravely, USS Mahan, and USS Ramage. The rebels in Syria also captured the village of Khanasir. It was the last key government supply route for the government forces in Aleppo.

=== 29 August ===
The British Parliament voted against Prime Minister David Cameron's proposal to take action against the Assad government in Syria in the wake of the Ghota chemical attack. Russia welcomed the vote, while France said that it did not alter their position. The United States deployed their fifth warship, the USS Stout, to the Mediterranean.

=== 30 August ===
The United States deployed their sixth warship, the USS San Antonio, to the Mediterranean, while President Obama decides to refrain the attack until the authorization of the Congress.

=== 31 August ===
President of the United States Barack Obama gave a speech in the White House rose garden in which he announced that he would seek authorization from Congress before using American military forces to intervene in the Syrian civil war. In the speech, he announced that he was "prepared to give that order," referring to ordering a strike on Syria. Obama argued that it was necessary to intervene because the recent chemical weapons attack in Syria "risks making a mockery of the global prohibition on the use of chemicals weapons" and that it put U.S. regional allies that share a border with Syria in danger.

== September 2013 ==
=== 3 September ===
Israel launches two missiles to test its advanced defence system. The launch has been detected by multiple Russian warships in the area. The naval battle group led by USS Nimitz (CV-68) is deployed in the area, while USS Mahan (DDG-72) is retired and reaches its homeport in Norfolk, Virginia. It was reported that Pro-Syrian government forces have retaken the town of Ariha, after losing it a week before.

=== 4 September ===
In response to the speech given by President Obama on 31 August, the United States Senate Committee on Foreign Relations approved the Authorization for the Use of Military Force Against the Government of Syria to Respond to Use of Chemical Weapons (S.J.Res 21). If the bill passes, it would allow the president to take direct action for up to 90 days; it specifically forbids putting "boots on the ground." The bill still needs to be approved by the full United States Senate and the United States House of Representatives before it would become law and thereby authorize US military intervention into the Syrian civil war.

At the same time, the number of Syrian refugees in Europe is constantly growing.

=== 8 September ===
Rebels, including al-Nusra Front forces, briefly took control of the historic Christian town of Maalula.

=== 15 September ===
Syrian army has completely regained Maaloula, see Battle of Maaloula for more detail.

=== 16 September ===
Abu Abdullah Libi, one of leaders of the Islamic State of Iraq and the Levant, was killed by FSA operatives close to a village of Hazano.

== October 2013 ==
=== 3 October ===
Syrian Army took back control of Khanasir.

=== 16 October ===
The government took full control of the town of Buweida in the Damascus Suburbs.

=== 17 October ===
Major General Jamaa Jamaa, Syrian General and head of the Military Intelligence in Deir Ezzour, was killed in the Reshdiya neighbourhood of Deir ez-Zour.

=== 30 October ===
During the Aleppo offensive, the Syrian Army captures Al-Safira.

== November 2013 ==
=== 1 November ===
Syrian Army captures the village of Aziziyeh on the northern outskirts of Safira.

=== 7 November ===
On 7 November, the Syrian army backed by Hezbollah, Al-Abbas brigade and the National Defense Force retook the key town of Al-Sabinah, south of Damascus. According to an opposition activist, military "progress on the ground without a doubt, because the regions were besieged for too long. This is normal." Abdel Rahman also blamed "divisions within the rebels."

=== 15 November ===
Syrian army capture Tell Hassel.

== December 2013 ==
=== 10 December ===
The Syrian army take full control of al-Nabk.

=== 27 December ===
Over 60 Islamic rebels are killed by a Syrian Army ambush at Qalamoun mountains.

=== 31 December ===
YPG units were locked in large-scale and bloody fighting around the jihadist stronghold of Tall Hamis. Government forces simultaneously attacked a YPG checkpoint in Hasakah and an Asayish checkpoint in nearby Tall Hajar neighbourhood. Seven soldiers were killed by the YPG and Asayish, while one YPG fighter lost his life and two Asayish members were wounded; civilian deaths and injuries were also reported. Government forces soon retreated.
