= Qudsaya =

Qudsaya قدسيا
- City
- Location in Syria
- Coordinates: 33°32′N 36°13′E
- Country: Syria
- Governorate: Rif Dimashq
- District: Qudsaya
- Subdistrict: Qudsaya
- Elevation: 800 m (2,600 ft)

Population (2004 census)
  - Total: 33,571

Qudsaya (Arabic: قدسيا, romanized: Qudsayā) is a Syrian city in Rif Dimashq Governorate and the administrative centre of Qudsaya District. The city is located on the western slope of Mount Qasioun, 7 km west of Damascus. According to the Syria Central Bureau of Statistics, Qudsaya had a population of 33,571 in the 2004 census. Adjacent to the town is the modern suburb of Dahiyat Qudsaya.

== History ==
During the Syrian Civil War, the town was taken by the rebels and blockaded by the government in 2012. A truce ending the blockade was reached in November 2013. The government placed the town under siege again in July 2015, until a deal was reached in November 2015 for the rebels to be transferred to Idlib province. On 12 October 2016, armed fighters turned in their weaponry as per the surrender deal in which about 150 rebel fighters from Qudsaya and al-Hamah will be allowed safe-passage to rebel-held areas in Idlib. More than 300 rebel fighters who have chosen to stay behind will have their cases settled. The agreement was completed on the following day, with rebels being allowed to leave along with their family members.

== Geography ==
=== Climate ===
Qudsaya has a cold semi-arid climate (Köppen climate classification: BSk). Rainfall is higher in winter than in summer. The average annual temperature in Qudsaya is 15.9 °C (60.6 °F). About 258 mm (10.16 in) of precipitation falls annually.

Climate data for Qudsaya
Month	Jan	Feb	Mar	Apr	May	Jun	Jul	Aug	Sep	Oct	Nov	Dec	Year
Mean daily maximum °C (°F)	10.8 (51.4)	12.5 (54.5)	16.2 (61.2)	21.2 (70.2)	26.8 (80.2)	31.6 (88.9)	34.0 (93.2)	34.4 (93.9)	30.8 (87.4)	25.9 (78.6)	18.8 (65.8)	13.1 (55.6)	23.0 (73.4)
Mean daily minimum °C (°F)	1.3 (34.3)	2.0 (35.6)	4.3 (39.7)	7.6 (45.7)	11.1 (52.0)	14.4 (57.9)	16.1 (61.0)	16.3 (61.3)	13.5 (56.3)	10.4 (50.7)	6.3 (43.3)	3.1 (37.6)	8.9 (47.9)
Average precipitation mm (inches)	60 (2.4)	47 (1.9)	30 (1.2)	15 (0.6)	10 (0.4)	0 (0)	0 (0)	0 (0)	0 (0)	10 (0.4)	31 (1.2)	55 (2.2)	258 (10.2)
Source: Climate-Data.org, Climate data
