= Yaafour =

Yaafour يعفور
- Town
- Location in Syria
- Coordinates: 33°32′N 36°04′E
- Country: Syria
- Governorate: Rif Dimashq Governorate
- District: Qatana District
- Nahiyah: Qatana

Population (2004 census)
  - Total: 4,638
- Time zone: UTC+2 (EET)
  - Summer (DST): UTC+3 (EEST)

Yaafour (Arabic: يعفور) is a Syrian town in the Qatana District of the Rif Dimashq Governorate. According to the Syria Central Bureau of Statistics (CBS), Yaafour had a population of 4,638 in the 2004 census. Its inhabitants are predominantly Sunni Muslims.

The presence of Druze around Mount Hermon is documented since the founding of the Druze religion in the beginning of the 11th century.
