= Al-Hamah =

Al-Hamah الهامة
- Village
- Location within Syria
- Coordinates: 33°33′29″N 36°13′20″E
- Country: Syria
- Governorate: Rif Dimashq
- District: Qudsaya
- Subdistrict: Qudsaya

Population (2004 census)
  - Total: 10,045
- Time zone: UTC+2 (EET)
  - Summer (DST): UTC+3 (EEST)

Al-Hamah (Arabic: الهامة; also spelled al-Hameh) is a village on the Barada river in the Qudsaya District of Rif Dimashq (Damascus Countryside) in southern Syria. It is west of the Syrian capital of Damascus city, beyond Mount Qasioun, and is now an outlying suburb of greater Damascus. It is between Qudsaya to the south and Jamraya to the north.

According to the Syria Central Bureau of Statistics, al-Hamah had a population of 10,045 in the 2004 census. Its inhabitants are predominantly Sunni Muslims and Syriac Christians.

== History ==
In 1838, Eli Smith noted that Al-Hamah‘s population was Sunni Muslim and Syriac Christian.

== Bibliography ==
- Robinson, E.; Smith, E. (1841). Biblical Researches in Palestine, Mount Sinai and Arabia Petraea: A Journal of Travels in the year 1838. Vol. 3. Boston: Crocker & Brewster.
