= Al-Sabboura =

Al-Sabboura الصبورة
- Town
- Location in Syria
- Coordinates: 33°30′54.4″N 36°07′33.2″E
- Country: Syria
- Governorate: Rif Dimashq Governorate
- District: Qatana District
- Nahiyah: Qatana

Population (2004 census)
  - Total: 10,969
- Time zone: UTC+2 (EET)
  - Summer (DST): UTC+3 (EEST)

Al-Sabboura (Arabic: الصبورة) is a Syrian town in the Qatana District of the Rif Dimashq Governorate. According to the Syria Central Bureau of Statistics (CBS), Al-Sabboura had a population of 10,969 in the 2004 census. Its inhabitants are predominantly Sunni Muslims.

== Syrian civil war ==
On 13 October 2022, 18 Syrian military personnel were killed and 27 others were injured after a Syrian military bus was bombed on a road in the village.
