= Mount Qasioun =

Mountain in Damascus, Syria

Coordinates: 33.54583°N 36.28639°E

- جَبَل قَاسِيُون
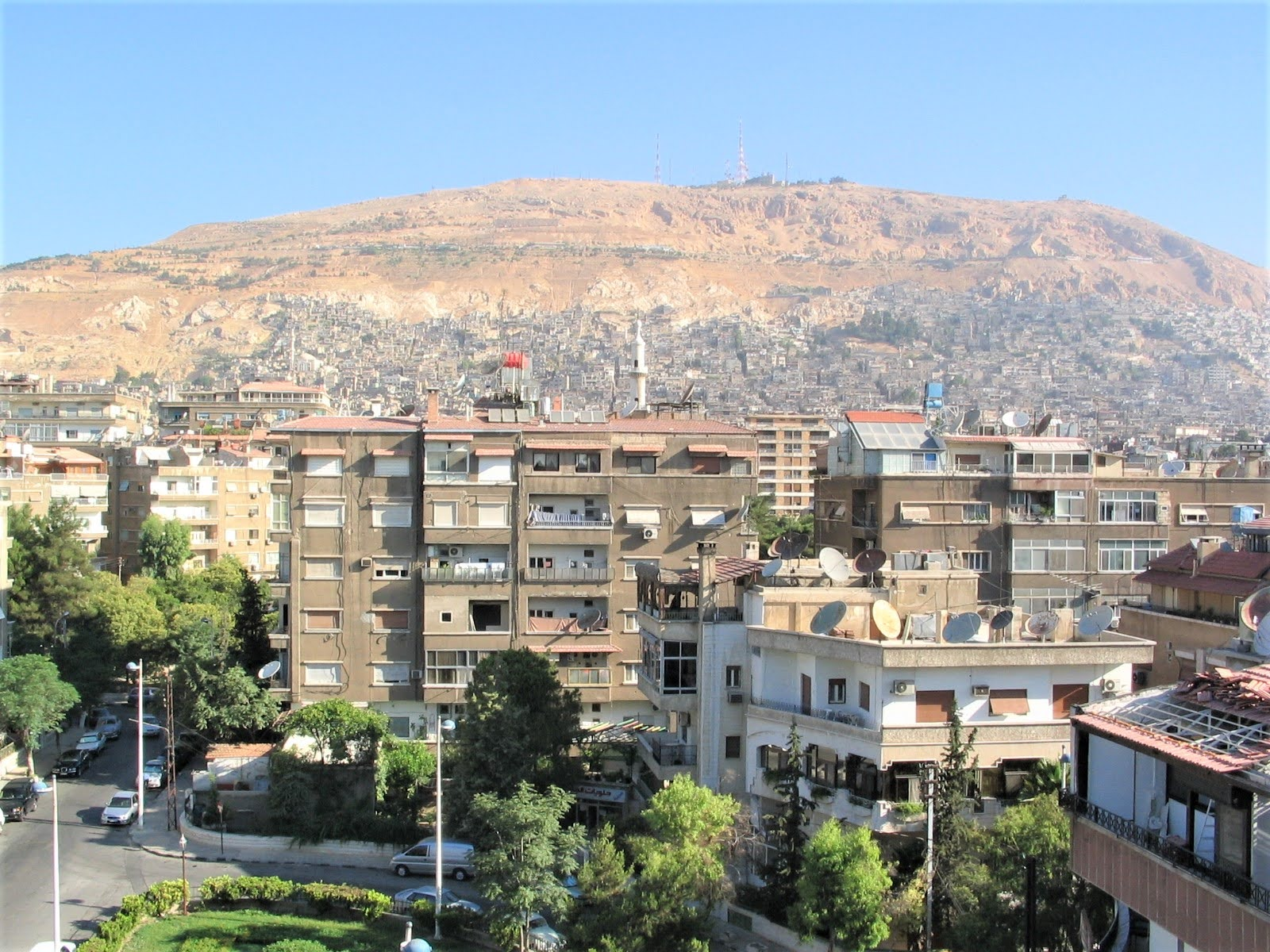
- Mount Qasioun overlooking Damascus, 2004

Highest point
- Elevation: 1,151 metres (3,776 ft)

Naming
- Etymology: Syriac for "hard and dry"
- Native name: جَبَل قَاسِيُون

Geography
- Location within Syria
- Location: Damascus, Syria
- Country: Syria
- Settlement: Damascus

Geology
- Rock type(s): Limestone and sedimentary rock

Climbing
- Easiest route: Road access from Damascus
- Access: Military-controlled areas and public access points

Mount Qasioun (Arabic: جَبَل قَاسِيُون, romanized: Jabal Qāsiyūn) is a mountain overlooking the city of Damascus, Syria. It has a range of restaurants, from which the whole city can be viewed. Due to its high elevation, several communications and broadcasting networks constructed relay stations at the summit for the city's communications. As the city has expanded over the years, some districts have been established at the foot of the mountain. Its highest point is 1,151 metres (3,776 ft).

== Etymology ==
The term Qasioun may mean ‘hard and dry’ in the Syriac language, which is the characteristic of the bare rocky mountain, which has no grass, greenery or water.

== History ==
The mountain was heavily entrenched with Syrian government forces from the start of the Syrian Civil War, since it was a strategic site in the battle for the outskirts of Damascus. A network of tunnels was dug into the mountain by the Syrian Arab Army to serve as a garrison for the Republican Guard and the mountain was also used as firing positions for snipers and artillery targeting rebel positions in Damascus. The tunnels were also said to have led to the Presidential Palace. Public access was restricted until the fall of the Assad regime in December 2024.

== Conservation ==
The mountain is also host to an endemic species of iris, Iris damascena, which can be found on the steep eastern slopes, at high elevation. The Syrian government has not given the species any protected status but part of the habitat of the species lies within a military area near the Qassioun Republican Guards Military Base and other military facilities, which prevents civilians from accessing the area. The base and steepness of the habitat also prevent construction or development, but it is still classified as "critically endangered".

== Religious significance ==
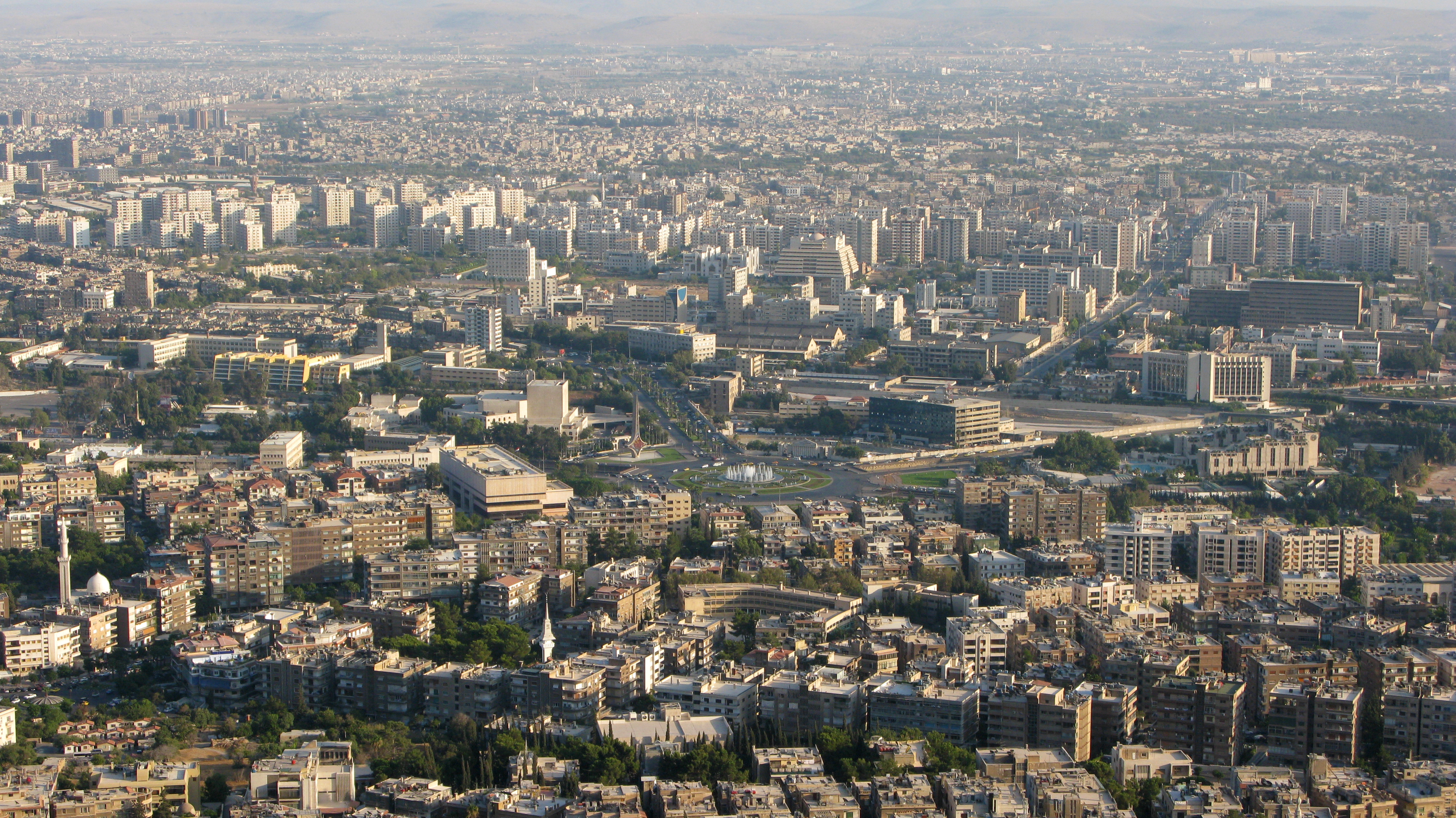
Damascus viewed from the mountain's top

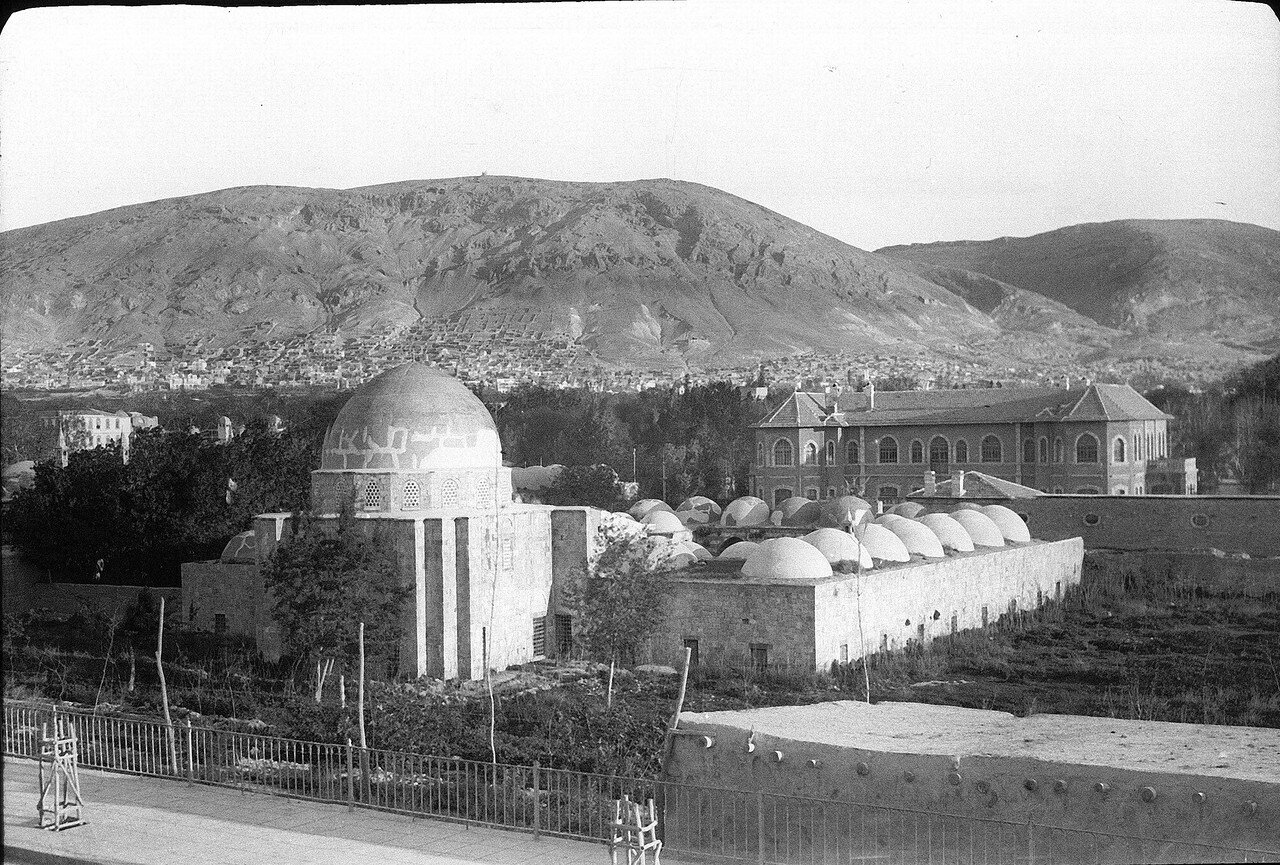
Damascus and Mount Qasioun in 1924

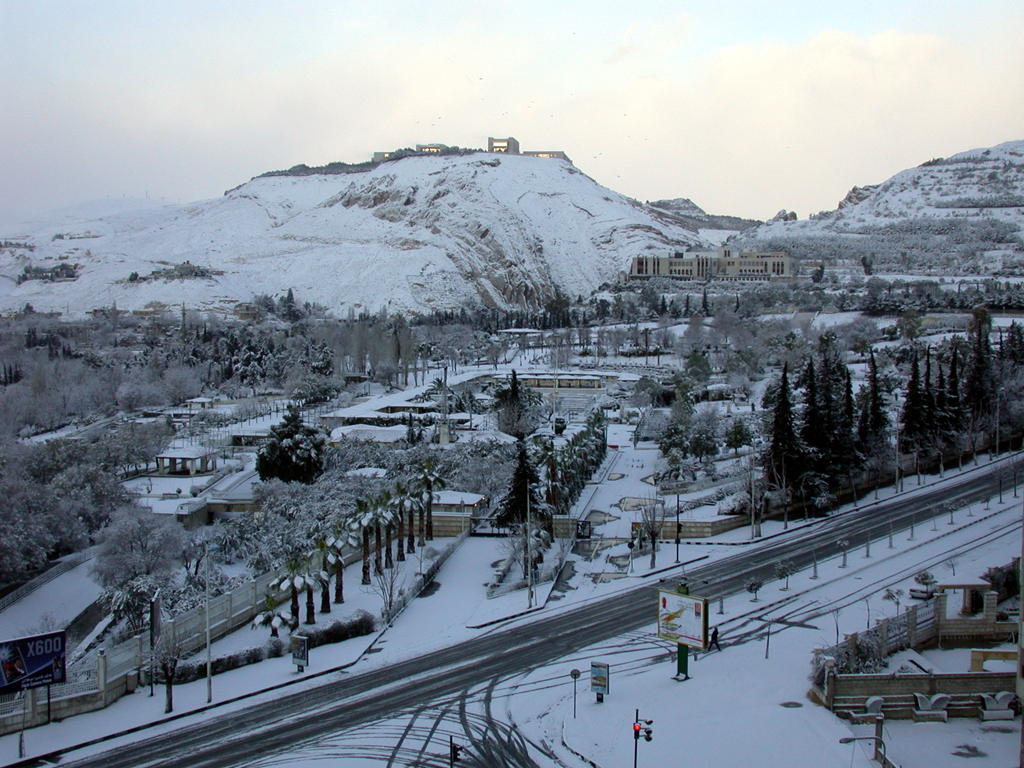
Snow covering the mountain in winter

=== Cave of Blood ===
On the slopes of Jabal Qassioun is a cave steeped in legend. It is said to have been inhabited at one point by the first human being, Adam, and there are various stories told about Abraham and Jesus also having prayed in it. It is mentioned in medieval Arab history books as having been the place where Cain killed Abel. It was known for hundreds of years as a place where prayers were immediately accepted, and especially in times of drought rulers of Damascus would climb to the cave and pray for rain. Because of the association with Cain's murder of Abel, claimed to be the first murder committed, the cave is called Maghārat al-Dam (the Cave of Blood).

According to Sunni Muslims, Mount Qassioun is the site of the mihrab (prayer niches) of the 40 arch-saints known as the Abdāl, who are said to pray the night vigil prayers every night. A small mosque has been built over the Cave of Blood containing these miḥrābs.

=== Cave of Hunger ===
Further down the mountain from the 'Cave of Blood', there was another cave known as Maghārat al-Jūˁ (the Cave of Hunger). Stories about this cave are somewhat confusing. Some say that forty saints died there of hunger; al-Harawī, however, who lived in the 13th century, wrote that it was said that forty prophets had died there of hunger. At present, the cave has been concealed by surrounding houses, but that spot is called al-Juyūˁīyah (Roughly 'the Place of the Hungry').

=== Cave of the Seven Sleepers ===
On another flank of the same mountain is yet another cave, which has come down in local legend as being the cave of the Seven Sleepers, mentioned in early Christian sources, as well as in the Quran, where they are known as the Aṣḥāb al-Kahf (Companions of the Cave). This is rather dubious, however, and it is only one of many caves in this part of the world that share the claim. A madrassah has been built over the cave, but pilgrims are still granted access.
