= Siege of al-Fu'ah and Kafriya =

Military operation

Coordinates: 35.98167°N 36.70167°E

- Part of the Syrian Civil War
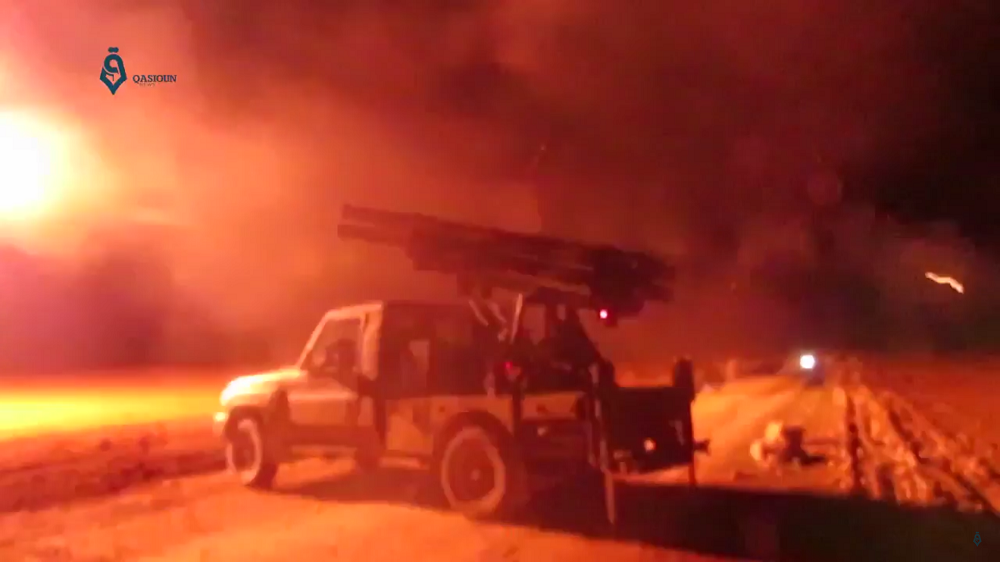
- Syrian rebels bombard al-Fu'ah and Kafriya using rocket artillery.
| Date | 28 March 2015 – 19 July 2018 (3 years, 3 months and 3 weeks) |
| Location | Al-Fu'ah and Kafriya, Idlib District, Idlib Governorate, Syria |
| Result | Rebel victory: Government forces and civilians reached an agreement to evacuate from Fu'ah and Kafriya on 17 July 2018 |

Belligerents
| Hay'at Tahrir al-Sham (2017–18); Army of Conquest (2015–17); Al-Nusra Front; Jaysh al-Sunna; Turkistan Islamic Party in Syria; Ajnad al-Sham; Liwa al-Haqq; Sham Legion (left the Army of Conquest in July 2016); Jund al-Aqsa (Note: Jund al-Aqsa left the Army of Conquest in October 2015, rejoined al-Nusra in October 2016, left again in January 2017.); Ahrar ash-Sham (Syrian Liberation Front since February 2018) (Syrian opposition) Free Syrian Army | (Syria) Syrian Arab Republic; Iran; Allied militias: Hezbollah; Quwat al-Ridha; Kata'ib Hezbollah |

Commanders and leaders
| Sheikh Abu al-Hassan al-Tunisi † (al-Nusra and al-Qaeda commander) (Katibat al-Tawhid wal-Jihad' leader) | Jamil Hussein Faqih † (Hezbollah operations leader in al-Fu'ah and Kafriya) |

Units involved
| Al-Nusra Front; Hay'at Tahrir al-Sham; Imam Bukhari Jamaat; Katibat al-Tawhid wal-Jihad; Jaish al-Muhajireen wal-Ansar; (Syrian opposition) Free Syrian Army; Tajamu Saraya Darayya (2018); 101st Infantry Division (2015) | Syrian Armed Forces; National Defense Force; Popular Committees (Syria); Hezbollah-affiliated local militias; Saryat al-Shaheed Abu Yasir (since 2015); Saryat al-'Ishq; Al-Wilaya Scouts; Imam Mahdi Scouts; Fatima al-Zahara Regiment; Islamic Republic of Iran Army; Islamic Revolutionary Guard Corps; Islamic Republic of Iran Air Force |

Strength
| 3,000–4,000 (2015; per gov.) | 4,000 (2015) |

Casualties and losses
| 650+ killed (gov. claim); 74–100+ killed (Sep. 2015 assault) | 40+ killed (Sep. 2015 assault) |
- 7 civilians killed (Sep. 2015 assault); 80+ civilians killed (by rebel snipers; March–Sep. 2016)

The siege of al-Fu'ah and Kafriya was a siege of the towns of al-Fu'ah and Kafriya in the Idlib Governorate, towns with majority Shia populations and controlled by the Syrian government during the Syrian civil war. The siege began with a Sunni Islamist rebel assault on the capital of the province in March 2015, resulting in the capture of Idlib. On 18 July 2018, the besieged government forces reached an agreement with Hay'at Tahrir al-Sham-led rebels to evacuate them and civilians from the two towns.

== The siege ==
=== 2015 ===
On 28 March 2015, after four days of fighting, rebels captured Idlib city and managed to besiege the towns of Kafriya and al‐Fu'ah, resulting in thousands of civilians being trapped in the two settlements. The Army of Conquest rebel alliance and one of its main components, al-Nusra Front, imposed a full siege, blocking all humanitarian supplies to the towns; the Syrian Observatory for Human Rights (SOHR) reported several executions of people accused of smuggling goods into Kafriya and al‐Fu'ah.

In July 2015, the battle of Zabadani began as Hezbollah and the Syrian Army launched an offensive against rebel-held al-Zabadani, as part of the Qalamoun offensive. The pro-government attack on Zabadani and the concurrent rebel siege of Kafriya and al-Fu'ah became linked in negotiations.

On 2 August, Army of Conquest announced it would continue its operations against the besieged enclave of Kafriya and al-Fu'ah. On 10 August, the rebels launched an assault on al-Fu'ah after detonating a car bomb and tunnel bomb, advancing towards it. A temporary ceasefire in Zabadani and the two Idlib towns was put in place after negotiations between Ahrar al-Sham rebels and an Iranian delegation in Turkey, but these collapsed in late August after the government refused the rebel demand to release 1,500 female detainees, according to Ahrar al-Sham.

Map showing the siege

On 31 August, Army of Conquest rebels launched a powerful attack on the enclave and captured al-Suwaghiyah, forcing the government soldiers to retreat to Tal Khirbat. Opposition media reported that the village of Deir al-Zaghab, due south of Kafariya and southeast of al-Fu'ah, had also been captured by rebels, but pro-government media said the pro-government forces had repelled an attack on the area. There were two days of protests in pro-government areas across Syria, including Sayeda Zainab, Homs and Latakia, calling on the government to save the civilians trapped in the siege; protesters burned tires and blocked the Damascus International Airport road. The government blamed the demonstrations on "young anarchists".

Between 3 and 5 September, government sources reported that the rebels intensively shelled the enclave and launched a number of attacks on al-Fu'ah and Kafriya from Maarrat Misrin, al-Suwaghiyah and Idlib city. The attacks were repelled, with the Syrian Army reportedly destroying three armoured vehicles.

On 18 September, the rebels launched a new attack on the enclave, firing almost 400 shells and rockets, while nine car bombs (including seven suicide bombers) were detonated at government positions. The clashes led to the death of at least 29 rebels and 21 Syrian soldiers, as well as seven civilians. The SOHR reported that the rebels gained some ground, though Iranian media said National Defence Forces and Hezbollah were able to defend their positions. Ajnad al-Sham threatened on social media to shell Fu'ah and Kafriya with over 100 mortars a day. On 19 September, SOHR reported that rebels advanced again in the vicinity of al-Fuah, capturing Tal Al-Khirbat and a number of checkpoints around it according to pro-government sources. According to government claims, the rebels lost over 100 fighters, including 31 foreign fighters.

On 20 September, a second cease-fire in al-Zabadani/Madaya and al-Fou'aa/Kafriya was implemented, where the rebels allowed humanitarian aid to the besieged civilians of al-Fu'ah and Kafriya. A violation of this cease-fire was reported the next day as the rebels resumed shelling the towns. Rebels again violated the cease-fire by shelling the towns at the end of the month, but the overall cease-fire held. The Iranian Air Force began to airdrop supplies for al-Fu'ah and Kafriya using two Lockheed C-130 Hercules in October.

=== 2016 ===
On 11 January 2016, the International Committee of the Red Cross and the World Food Programme organized an aid convoy to deliver food, medicine and other aid to Kafriya and Fu'ah, along with Madaya in the south.

On 21 July, two ill civilians from Fu'ah and Kafriya were evacuated to Latakia by the Syrian Arab Red Crescent, in return for two ill civilians also being evacuated from Zabadani to Idlib. Medical and food aid arrived to the towns, in addition to Qalaat al-Madiq.

At the end of September, 52 aid trucks went to Zabadani and Madaya and 19 arrived in Fu'ah and Kafriya.

On 21 November, rebel shelling and sniper fire killed at least one civilian in Fu'ah and Kafriya.

From 3–6 December, more than 10 civilians in Fu'ah and Kafriya were killed by rebel shelling, in retaliation to the Syrian Air Force bombings throughout the governorate which killed more than 121 civilians.

On 18 December, a group of busses from Aleppo headed toward Fu'ah and Kafriya in order to evacuate 2,500 civilians there as part of an agreement that would also evacuate the remaining civilians from the former rebel-held districts of Aleppo after the offensive. En route, 6 buses were attacked and burned by fighters from the al-Nusra Front, preventing the evacuation. Two days later, more than 1,000 people from Fu'ah and Kafriya left the towns in the buses and headed to Aleppo.

=== 2017 ===
In January 2017, according to SOHR, rebels shelled al-Fu'ah, which led to several injuries. In mid-March, Hay'at Tahrir al-Sham (HTS) captured Tall Umm A'anoun hill from the NDF in an attempt to cut the road linking Fu'ah and Kafriya.

On 28 March, an agreement was brokered by Qatar and signed by Ahrar al-Sham, HTS, Hezbollah and Iran, for the evacuation of Fu'ah and Kafriya in exchange for the evacuation of residents and rebels in Zabadani and Madaya. The agreement came into effect beginning on 12 April and buses and ambulances arrived in the four towns with the assistance of the Syrian Arab Red Crescent to begin the evacuations. The Free Syrian Army condemned the agreement, considering it to establish a dangerous precedent of ethnic and sectarian cleansing in preparation for redrawing the borders of the Syrian state, as well as a crime against humanity and contrary to article 7, paragraph (d), of the Statute of the International Criminal Court.

On 14 April 75 buses and 20 ambulances evacuated around 5,000 people from Fu'ah and Kafriya to Aleppo. On 15 April, a convoy of buses carrying evacuees was attacked by a suicide bomber west of Aleppo, killing more than 100 people.

In September, seven trucks carrying medical supplies, food and an electric generator were allowed by the rebels into the besieged towns, while the government in exchange allowed supplies into the insurgent-held Yarmouk Camp.

=== 2018 ===
On 17 March 2018, FSA fighters of "Saraya Darayya", a group formed by rebels from Damascus who had been exiled to Idlib following the end of the siege of Darayya and Muadamiyat, assaulted NDF positions in the two towns. Pro-government sources claimed that the attacks had failed, while Saraya Darayya claimed to have killed many NDF fighters.

On 17 July, Iranian negotiators reached an agreement with Hay'at Tahrir al-Sham, with Turkey as a mediator, to evacuate the former's forces and civilians, totaling between 6,500 and 7,000 people, from Fu'ah and Kafriya. A total of 121 buses accompanied by Syrian Arab Red Crescent ambulances entered the two towns the next day. The buses were attacked by HTS fighters with stones, but departed on the morning of 19 July. In return, the government released 1,500 detainees and rebel fighters from its prisons, of which at least 400 were transported to Idlib on the same day.

== Aftermath ==
During the evacuations, 126 unarmed civilians, the majority of which were children were killed via suicide bombing before they could make it into the safety of government-held territory. Following the evacuation, the surviving civilians from al-Fu'ah and Kafriya were mostly resettled to Hisyah in Homs Governorate and al-Basit in Latakia Governorate. Smaller numbers of refugees also moved to Aleppo, Damascus, Nubl, and al-Zahraa.

== See also ==
- Siege of Nubl and Al-Zahraa
- Siege of Deir ez-Zor (2014–17)
- Battle of Zabadani (2015)
- 2015 Zabadani cease-fire agreement
