= 2017 Aleppo suicide car bombing =

Suicide car bombing in Syria

- Part of the Syrian Civil War
- Location: 36°10′10″N 37°03′24″E; Rashideen District, western Aleppo, Syria
- Date: 15 April 2017; 9 years ago
- Weapon: Car bomb
- Deaths: 126+
- Injuries: 55+
- Perpetrator: Unknown Suicide bomber

On 15 April 2017, a car bomb detonated near a convoy of buses in the al-Rashideen neighbourhood of western Aleppo, Syria. The buses carried civilian evacuees from the besieged government-controlled towns of al-Fu'ah and Kafriya and were guarded by rebel fighters. The bombing killed at least 126 people including at least 80 children.

The bus evacuation was part of an agreement brokered by the Syrian government, Iran, and Qatar, and implemented by the Syrian Arab Red Crescent. Under the terms of the evacuation deal, residents of the Shia communities of al-Fu'ah and Kafriya, which supported the Syrian government and were surrounded by the Army of Conquest, would be transported to Aleppo. In return, residents of Madaya and Al-Zabadani, which are Sunni-majority and support the opposition, would be transported to the Idlib province.

== Bombing ==
Witnesses narrations of the bombing

The attack took place in the Rashideen district, in the western outskirts of the city of Aleppo, at about 15:30 local time. According to some journalists, the bomb was in a car that parked and began distributing crisps to attract children. This car was near the front of a convoy of buses that were stopped at a checkpoint to move injured refugees. An investigation by Bellingcat disputed that it was an aid vehicle, but instead a third-generation Hyundai Porter Super Cab, bearing a "W77" label and a yellow-green-red color scheme, of indeterminate affiliation.

Early reports indicated that a few dozen people had been killed, but the confirmed death toll rose to 126 by the following day, according to the Syrian Observatory for Human Rights. The Observatory said that 109 of the dead were refugees, including 68 children, with the remainder rebel fighters and aid workers, though a spokesman for the Ahrar al-Sham rebel group said that about 30 of its members were killed. According to the White Helmets civil defense group, 55 people were injured.

The bombing led to the suspension of evacuations for several days; they resumed on 19 April with tight security at the Rashideen checkpoint. Three days after the bombing, a United Nations spokesperson said that the bombing was "likely a war crime" and a person of interest seen in footage prior to the bombing is being investigated.

== Perpetrator ==
The perpetrator's identity is unknown. According to Syrian state television, the civilians of Fuaa and Kafriya supported the government during the rebel siege of the towns, and the rebels were responsible for the bombing. Ahrar al-Sham denied responsibility, and members of the opposition suggested that the Assad government might have been behind the attack as a way of diverting attention from the Khan Shaykhun chemical attack. Rami Abdulrahman, the director of the Syrian Observatory for Human Rights (SOHR), stated in a televised interview that he believed the bombing was not done by the Syrian government.

== Reactions ==
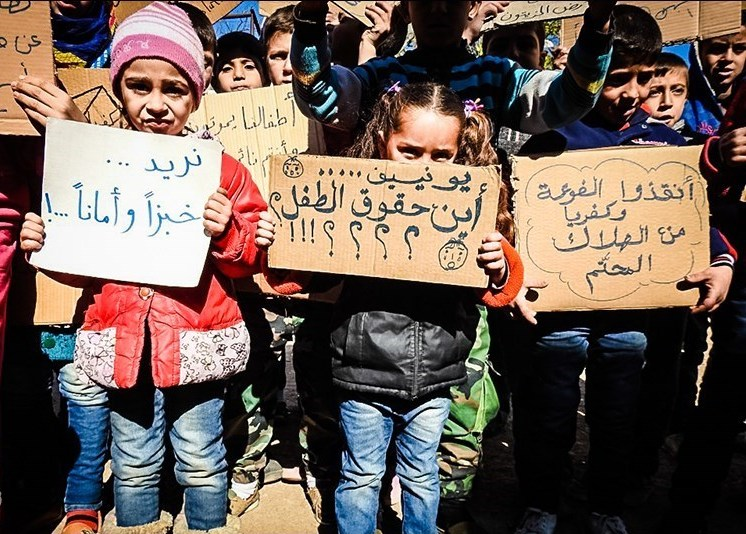
Children holding placards with inscriptions "We want bread and security", "UNICEF where is children's rights?", "save al-Fu'ah and Kafriya from certain death"

Secretary-General of the United Nations António Guterres requested that all parties guarantee the security of those waiting to be evacuated. Pope Francis condemned the bombing during his Easter Sunday address, calling it a "vile attack on fleeing refugees". The Turkish Foreign Ministry said that the attack "has shown once again the necessity to strengthen the ceasefire agreement".

Robert Fisk, writing for The Independent, criticized the United States government for a double standard regarding the attack, contrasting its silence on the bombing with its reaction to the Khan Shaykhun chemical attack earlier in the month; he said that "after this weekend's suicide bombing [...] the White House said nothing [...] because–and here's the point–they were the victims of the wrong kind of killer."

== See also ==
- 2015 Zabadani cease-fire agreement for the four-town evacuation agreement involving the buses
- List of bombings during the Syrian Civil War
