= Battle of Idlib (2015) =

Military operation in Syria

Coordinates: 35.6436°N 36.6997°E

- Part of the Syrian civil war and the 2015 Idlib offensive
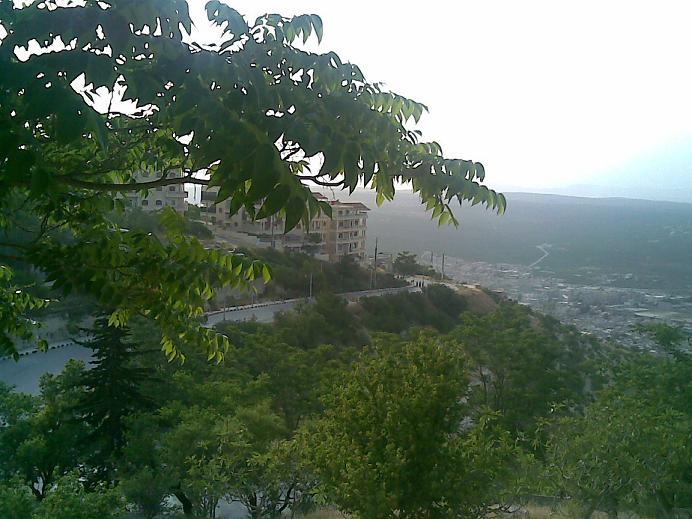
- Image of a typical olive field in the valleys surrounding Idlib
Date	24–28 March 2015 (4 days)
Location	Idlib, Idlib Governorate, Syria
Result	Rebel victory
Territorial changes	Rebels capture Idlib city and besiege Kafarya and al-Fu'ah, while government forces retreat to al-Mastouma

Belligerents
Army of Conquest: Al-Nusra Front; Ahrar al-Sham; Sham Legion; Jaysh al-Sunna; Liwa al-Haqq; Ajnad ash-Sham; Ajnad al-Kavkaz; Tarkhan's Jamaat	(Ba'athist Syria) Syrian Arab Republic: Syrian Armed Forces; National Defense Force; Hezbollah

Commanders and leaders
Abu Jamil al-Qutb † (Ahrar ash-Sham deputy leader); Abu Kamal (Ahrar ash-Sham Central Area commander); Hassan al-Khalifa † (Omar al-Farouq Brigade commander); Nathir Terman † (al-Nusra field commander); Abu Abdullah Taoum † (Ajnad ash-Sham leader)	(Ba'athist Syria) Mohamed Khair al-Sayyed (Governor of Idlib); Al Hajj Walaa † (Hezbollah commander)

Units involved
Ahrar al-Sham; Omar al-Farouq Brigade	(Ba'athist Syria) 11th Armored Division (Ba'athist Syria) 155th Brigade

Strength
3,000–6,000 fighters	330–380 (Special Operations Unit S.A.A. Fighters)

Casualties and losses
132 fighters killed, 36 infiltrators executed	66–86 soldiers killed, 5 soldiers and 6 tanks captured
- 11 civilians killed, 15 prisoners executed by the Syrian Army

The Battle of Idlib ("Operation to Free Idlib") was a military operation in the Idlib Governorate, during the Syrian civil war, conducted by rebels against Syrian government forces defending Idlib city.

== Battle ==
Situation in Idlib Governorate, mid-March 2015

On 24 March 2015, the newly established Fattah Army operation room ("The Army of Conquest") urged people in Idlib city to remain indoors. Later that day, two fighters from Jund al-Aqsa blew themselves up near Army checkpoints, on the eastern side of the city, followed by a three-pronged assault on Idlib. The rebels took control of the Sadkop Factory at the eastern outskirts of the Industrial District and advanced towards the Old Textile Factory before soldiers from the 11th Tank Division arrived to reinforce the NDF and push back rebel fighters to the east, securing the perimeter around the Idlib Public Cemetery. Meanwhile, at the northwestern entrance to Idlib, the rebels attacked a number of NDF checkpoints, reaching the northern side of the Youth Housing. Overall during the day, the rebels captured seven checkpoints, but the Army managed to recapture four of them, including reportedly re-securing the northern perimeter of the Youth Housing.

According to a rebel commander, the clashes resulted in the death of many fighters from both sides. The SOHR put the death toll at 20 government fighters and 19 rebels, including three suicide bombers. Two of the bombers were foreigners from Gulf states. According to a military source, 44 rebels and 16 soldiers were killed. Five soldiers were also captured.

During the attack, the al-Nusra Front used US-made BGM-71 TOW captured from Western-backed rebel groups.

In response to the rebel assault on Idlib, government forces reportedly launched a chlorine bomb attack on the rebel-held town of Binnish, leaving dozens of people hospitalized. The next day, the air force also struck the town of Saraqib, killing 11 civilians.

On 25 March, the rebels regained the four checkpoints they lost the previous day, while a fourth suicide car-bombing occurred near the city. Throughout the day, the fighting focused on the eastern entrance to the city. In the evening, according to government sources, more elements of the 11th Tank Division arrived in Idlib and launched a counter-attack in the Industrial District. In the day's fighting, Abu Jamil Yusuf Qutb, the deputy leader of Ahrar ash-Sham, was killed during an attack on an Army checkpoint near Idlib. The Hezbollah commander Al Hajj Walaa was also killed that day.

Rebel sources reported that 36 soldiers were executed in Idlib for passing information to the rebels for the offensive.

By the end of the second day of fighting, the rebels were in control of 17 checkpoints and military outposts, according to the SOHR. Government sources acknowledged the rebels were in control of the factories to the east of the city, with the Al-Sina’a (Industrial) Quarter being contested. However, the sources stated the Youth Housing and Al-Mahraab Quarters were declared safe zones after the rebels were driven back to the outskirts, following multiple artillery strikes by the 155th Brigade at the Hama Military Airport.

On 26 March, heavy fighting took place around the eastern entrance of Idlib, which lasted into the night, killing 26 rebels and 4 soldiers. According to opposition sources, rebels captured the Al-Sina’a (Industrial) Quarter and managed to besiege the towns of Kafrayah and al-Fu'ah, after capturing a number of checkpoints connecting these towns with Idlib. The military denied this and stated that the alleged rebel gains were fabricated, but acknowledged the rebels reached the city gates for the first time since the offensive started.

On 27 March, clashes in and around Idlib continued, leaving 14 rebels and 6 soldiers dead. One of the rebels killed was a Saudi commander (emir) in the al-Nusra Front. For the first time, the rebels managed to enter the city neighbourhoods, after they advanced from the northwestern and southeastern sides of Idlib. At this point, the city was almost completely encircled by rebel groups, leaving only two exit routes for government forces. The advance into the city came after the NDF retreated from the northern silos, and the opposition fighters captured most of the Hara North district and farms of Hara West.

On 28 March, after NDF reinforcements arrived, at 6 A.M., a government counterattack was launched, which forced the rebels to withdraw from inside of Idlib, and government troops recaptured areas on the city outskirts. However, later in the day, rebel forces made new advances into Idlib, and at that point, were in control of up to 24 checkpoints and some neighbourhoods in the city. It was also reported that the rebels captured the pro-government journalist Abdul Ghani Jaruch. Hours later, rebels seized control of most of the city after government forces pulled back, except for the government and security buildings. However, by the end of the day, rebels were in full control of the city, with scanning and mopping-up operations continuing.

During the Syrian government's retreat, 15 prisoners who were being held at the military intelligence headquarters were reportedly executed, while the rebels captured six tanks. Rebels managed to free 53 prisoners from the same complex. Syrian government troops regrouped south of the city, and were preparing for a possible attack by rebel forces.

== Aftermath ==
Situation in Idlib Governorate, late-March 2015

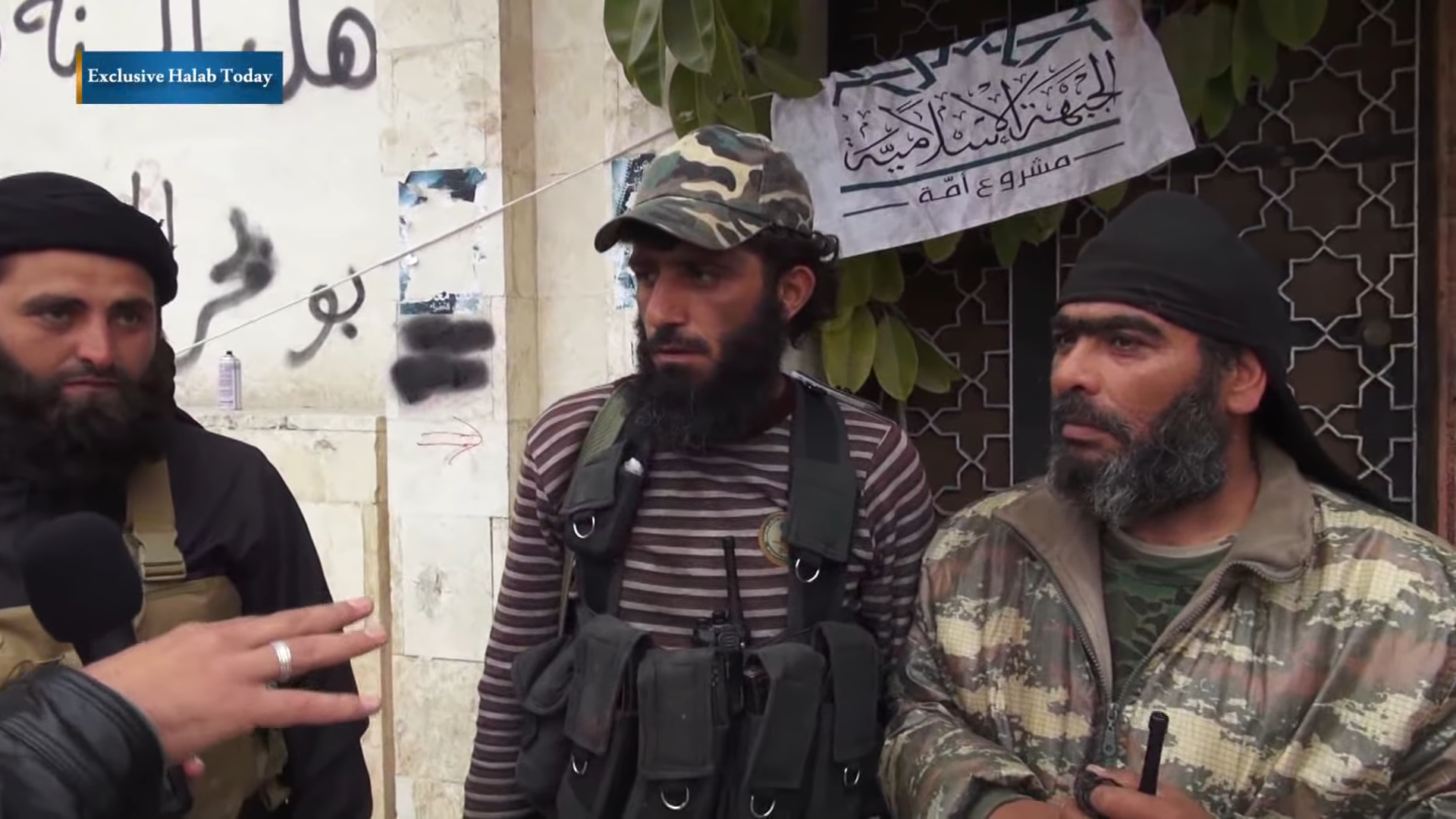
Ahrar al-Sham and Sham Legion field commanders in Idlib after they participated in the battle to capture the city, 30 March 2015

An exodus of thousands of Idlib city civilians to nearby towns and villages was reported a day after rebels took the city. Ahrar al-Sham issued a statement where it called for a unified Sharia-based management of the city of Idlib by the groups that captured it. Ahrar ash-Sham also threatened to shell the besieged twin Shiite towns al-Fouaa and Kefraya in response to "any cowardly shelling carried out against the civilians in Idlib". Ajnad al-Sham announced that its military leader, Abu Abdullah Taoum, was killed during clashes around al-Fouaa.

Meanwhile, the Western-backed Syrian National Coalition announced in a statement that it would shift its headquarters from Istanbul to Idlib city. The al-Nusra Front refuted this with Abdullah Mohammed al-Mheisnei, a top al-Nusra Islamic cleric, stating on his Twitter account “It is false that the [SNC] will enter Idlib!”. Fears had already surfaced that al-Nusra would possibly enforce a harsh religious rule over Idlib. At least one incident happened in the city, right after its capture, where foreign al-Nusra militants killed two Christians after hearing they worked in a liquor store. Consequently, Ahrar ash-Sham fighters rebuked the foreigners and set up checkpoints to protect Christians from them, with the group claiming to have secured 20 Christian families in Idlib. In response to al-Mheisnei, Ahmad Tu'mah, prime minister of the Syrian Interim Government, stated "it is not true that Jabhat al-Nusra refused our entry. It is actually a leader who rejected our entry and it is his right to express his opinion. We noticed during our work that not a single faction that currently represents the Army of Conquest attacked us. Moreover, Jabhat al-Nusra did not attack our relief convoys or our education or health work. The person talked about his point of view and did not issue any public statement in this regard. No one told us that it is forbidden for us to enter" and added that the Syrian interim government still intended to relocate to Idlib as long as they can be defended from attacks by the Assad government. Still, the question of whether an Islamic emirate would be established in Idlib remained. However, by the end of April, opposition forces established civil councils and public services. Still, an official message from al-Nusra leader, Ahmed al-Sharaa, declared that the city would be governed according to Sharia, via Shura and a civil council, but showed no indication of declaring the Idlib the capital of an emirate. In response to this, a Syria expert from the Al-Hayat newspaper believed Sharia implementation would be limited following pressure on Al-Nusra from Saudi Arabia and Qatar.

On 30 March, a Syrian military source accused both Turkey and Jordan of supporting the rebels in their Idlib offensive. Military shelling and airstrikes struck the city, leaving 23 civilians dead. The bombardment reportedly included chemical weapons. Overall, between 28 and 30 March 47 people, including 15 rebels, were killed in the bombardment of Idlib city. It was also reported that Colonel Suhayl al-Hasan was sent to oversee a potential operation to recapture Idlib. In contrast, an NDF fighter stationed at Jisr al-Shughour spoke to al-Masdar news and stated government troops around the city were in a state of disarray.

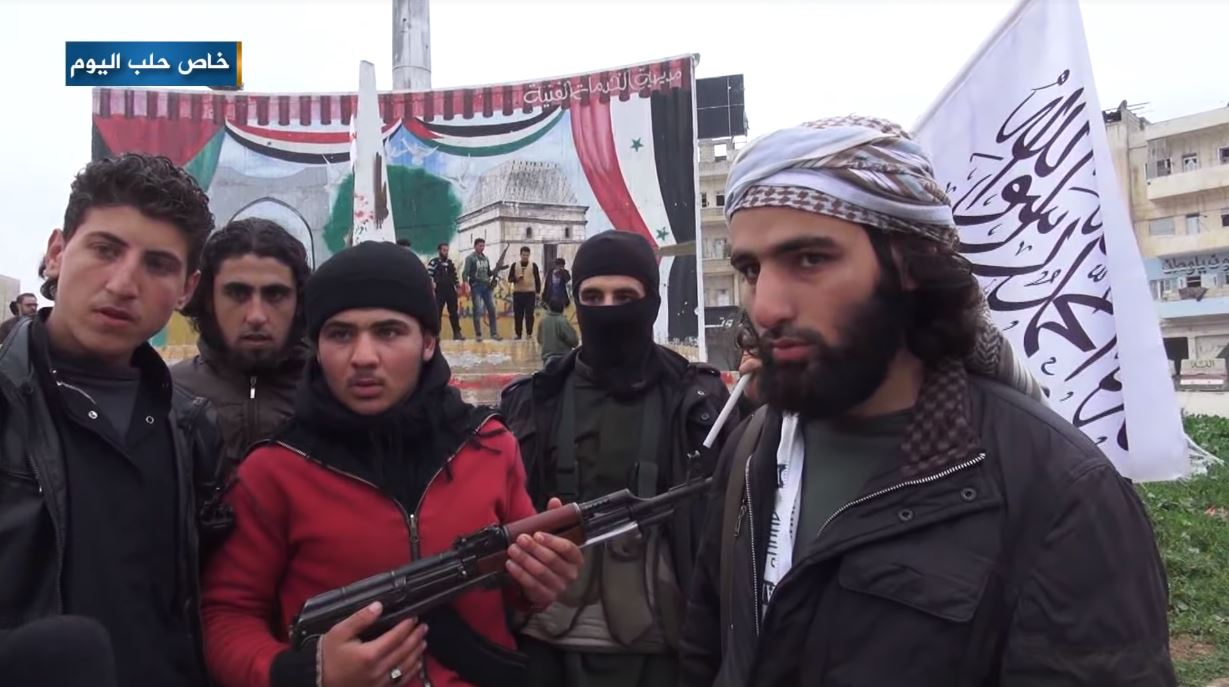
Syrian rebels deface a Ba'athist mural at the Mihrab roundabout in Idlib, after the city's capture by rebel forces in 2015

On 1 April, the al-Nusra Front stated Idlib would be ruled according to Islamic Sharia law, but the group would not seek to monopolize power there. The next day, rebels launched an attack on the Mastouma military camp, where most of the retreated government forces were positioned, and advanced.

== Analysis ==
Idlib became the second provincial capital to fall to rebel forces, after Raqqa which was captured by the rebels in March 2013, but were subsequently routed from it by the Islamic State of Iraq and the Levant. Rebels also captured the town of Quneitra in August 2014, which is nominally the capital of the Quneitra province, but had been largely destroyed and abandoned since the Six-Day War with Israel in 1967.

According to some, it was a major political and strategic defeat for the Syrian government. Stratfor described the battle as a "pivotal victory" for opposition forces, while The Long War Journal called it "the most significant blow" to the government in months. Aron Lund of Syria Comment commented the defeat of government defenses in Idlib had "punched a gaping hole in the government’s narrative of approaching victory and boosted the opposition politically as well as militarily, spelling trouble for Bashar al-Assad", while Charles Lister, a visiting fellow at the Brookings Doha Center, speculated the fall of Idlib would be a big shock to the government and its supporters. According to others, Idlib had little or limited strategic value and was more of a morale boost to opposition forces.

Now that the city was captured, rebels would potentially focus on other objectives, such as the Abu Duhour air base, Ariha, Hama, Nubl, Zahra, military supply routes to Aleppo, and potentially striking the government heartland of Latakia. The twin Shia towns of Fouaa and Kefray, now besieged, would face destruction and perhaps a sectarian massacre if they did not agree to a peace settlement with rebel forces, according to a post from Syria Comment, run by Joshua Landis. This was countered by Lina Khatib of the Carnegie Endowment, who stated in a recent report on the al-Nusra Front in northern Syria that “The vast majority of those who support al-Nusra are not driven by ideology but by anti-Assad sentiment”. However, others were of the opinion that a potential rebel advance on other fronts as a result of this battle would not happen if government forces launched a counterattack to retake the city. In addition, it was viewed that the fall of Idlib would complicate Turkish efforts to win support for the enforcement of a no-fly zone over northern Syria.

Taking into account the role of al-Nusra Front, al-Qaeda's Syrian branch, the possibility of Idlib being the effective capital of al-Nusra-controlled territories was raised. An Ahrar al-Sham member, referring to this possibility, stated “I think al-Nusra is too smart to try that". Ahmed al-Sharaa stated that al-Nusra Front does not "want to monopolise rule over Idlib city", calling for power sharing and adding that authority "does not come from scaring the people, but in protecting them, defeating their oppressor and defending the weak". Still, by May 2016, al-Nusra made unilateral attempts to expand its control over both Idlib and other nearby rebel-held towns, with the aim of laying the groundwork for al Qaeda’s first sovereign state (or Emirate) as Charles Lister described it.

== See also ==
- Battle of Idlib (2012)
- Battle of Aleppo (2012–16)
- Battle of Raqqa (March 2013)
- Siege of al-Fu'ah and Kafriya
