= Rif Dimashq clashes (November 2011–March 2012) =

Unrest and armed clashes in Syria

Rif Dimashq clashes (November 2011 – March 2012)
- Part of the Early insurgency phase of the Syrian civil war
Date	3 November 2011 – 1 April 2012 (3 months, 3 weeks and 6 days)
Location	Rif Dimashq Governorate, Syria
Result	Damascus centre under Government control; Protests largely suppressed in the city

Belligerents
Syrian Opposition; (Syrian opposition) Free Syrian Army; Kata’ib Ahrar Al-Sham; Al-Nusra Front	(Syria) Syrian Government; Syrian Police; Syrian Armed Forces; PFLP–GC

Commanders and leaders
(Syrian opposition) Unknown	Brig. Gen. Maher al-Assad; Brig. Gen. Mohammed al-Awwad X Brig. Gen. Hassan al-Ibrahim †; Brig. Gen. Rajeh Mahmoud †

Units involved
(Syrian opposition) Free Syrian Army; (Syrian opposition) Abu Ubaidah ibn al-Jarrah Battalion; (Syrian opposition) Muawiyah bin Abi-Sufyan Battalion	Syrian Armed Forces; Syrian Army; 1st Army Corps: 3rd Armoured Division; 7th Mechanized Division; 4th Armoured Division; Republican Guard: 101 Security Regiment; 102 Security Regiment; Syrian Air Force; Damascus Police; Jihad Jibril Brigades

Strength
Unknown	50,000 soldiers and policemen

Casualties and losses
At least 1,000 killed	At least 880 killed
- A few hundred protesters and civilians killed

The Rif Dimashq clashes were a series of unrests and armed clashes in and around Damascus, the capital of Syria, from November 2011 until a stalemate in March 2012. The violence was part of the wider early insurgency phase of the Syrian civil war. Large pro-government and anti-government protests took place in the suburbs and center of Damascus, with the situation escalating when members of the Free Syrian Army (FSA) started attacking military targets in November.

It is claimed that in January 2012, parts of rural Damascus and the Damascus suburbs started to fall under opposition control. On 27 January 2012, the Syrian Army launched a military operation which retook the Damascus suburbs and the town of Zabadani with the offensive ending on 11 February. However, fighting still continued, when on 15 February FSA fighters were seen on the streets of a district in the Damascus centre, trying to recruit opposition protesters and mingling with them. A few anti-government protests were still ongoing after the army offensive.

On 12 March 2012, major clashes were reported in central Damascus between the FSA and the Syrian Army for the first time. By April 2012 a fragile cease-fire was brokered by the UN peace envoy Kofi Annan. However, following the cease fire collapse, by July 2012, rebels erupted again into most Damascus suburbs and rural areas around the city, launching the Battle of Damascus, also known as Operation Damascus Volcano.

== 2011 unrests and clashes ==
Large anti-government protests were shot at by Shabiha, killing 23 protesters in a single day. More were killed in October and November. Ten more protesters were killed around Damascus, including a 14-year-old boy.

Fourteen were killed in house-to-house raids and in protests in Damascus suburbs, and an activist in the eastern Damascus suburb of Harasta, who gave his name as Assem, said three deserters were killed after they abandoned military units which fired live ammunition at a demonstration of 1,500–2,000 people in the al-Zar neighbourhood. "Security police could not put down the demonstration. The eight soldiers defected when Republican Guards and the Fourth Armoured Division were sent in," he said.

=== November 2011 ===
On 16 November 2011, according to opposition sources, Syrian army deserters attacked a military intelligence office in Harasta, a suburb of the capital Damascus, killing six soldiers and wounding more than 20. "The Syrian Free Army struck with rockets and RPGs" (rocket-propelled grenades) said Omar Idlibi, the Beirut-based spokesperson for the opposition Syrian Local Co-ordination Committees. It was also said that all the army defectors involved returned after the attack. All other attacks targeted military checkpoints in the suburbs of Douma, Qaboun and Arabeen and Saqba, killing three soldiers. A Russian official said that the outbreak of fighting in Damascus "looks like a civil war."

On 20 November 2011, a loud explosion was reported to have occurred in the heart of Damascus, the Syrian capital, amid reports of a grenade attack on offices of the ruling Baath Party, the boldest attack by army defectors at the time. The Free Syrian Army later claimed responsibility for the attack, saying they fired two rocket-propelled grenades at the building.

=== December 2011 ===
In December 2011, Al Jazeera published an article stating that protesters in the suburbs of Damascus gathered every evening to make their support for the Free Syrian Army known. Seeing though that this disinformation did not bring anyone to the streets, the article was later changed into.

On 4 December 2011, the Syrian Arab News Agency (SANA) reported that a funeral procession was held on Sunday for 13 soldiers who were killed. It claimed that they were killed while in the line of duty in the Damascus countryside.

On 9 December 2011, two children, aged 10 and 12, were among others killed by Syrian security forces on Friday in Homs and on the outskirts of Damascus, rights groups said. On 13 December, another person died.

On 23 December 2011, Syrian state TV claimed that two explosions at security bases in Damascus were caused by suicide bombers; a number of military personnel and civilians were killed. At least 44 people were reported killed and 55 others wounded. State television claimed that "several soldiers and a large number of civilians" had been killed in the bombings although an exact figure was hard to ascertain.

On 29 December 2011, Syrian security forces opened fire on tens of thousands protesting outside a mosque in a Damascus suburb called Douma, close to a municipal building that members of the Arab League monitoring mission were believed to be visiting. At least four protesters died. Rami Abdul-Rahman, head of the one-man British-based Syrian Observatory for Human Rights (SOHR), said about 20,000 people were protesting outside the Grand Mosque in Douma when troops opened fire. Cars belonging to the Arab League monitors were seen in front of a municipal building close to the mosque, he said. Abdul-Rahman and other activists said the monitors were barred by security officials from entering Douma following the killings, after the situation deteriorated.

== 2012 unrests and clashes ==
=== January 2012 ===
On 4 January 2012, a journalist, host for state-owned Radio Damascus, and editor for the state-owned daily Al-Thawra, was shot in the head by unidentified gunmen on Friday in his home in the Damascus suburb of Darya. State television reported that the journalist was targeted by "armed terrorist groups."

On 6 January 2012, SANA claimed that another suicide bomber killed at least 26 when a police building or intelligence building was attacked. However, the opposition pointed the finger at the government, saying "this is a plot staged by the government to deter thousands of people that were planning to converge on that same spot to call for the international community to step in and enforce a no-fly zone and enforce also a dramatic end to the regime". Later SANA reported the death of General Mohammed Abdul-Hamid al-Awwad, claiming he was assassinated while he was headed for work in the al-Ghouta area of Damascus. His driver, who was injured, said, "as we were heading to the Brigadier General's military unit, we saw a taxi on the right of the road…it overtook us and then blocked our way. Four gunmen started shooting at us. Brigadier al-Awwad was shot in the head and I was also injured."

On 7 January 2012, 14 protesters were said to have died though a roadside bomb blast and anti-government protests on the same day.

On 12 January 2012, state TV reported that an army bus was attacked in the area of the Damascus countryside with another roadside bomb and gunfire, killing four soldiers and wounding eight. Six more soldiers (including a colonel) were killed in battles around the province, according to the Syrian government.

On 19 January 2012, a Syrian security officer was killed after the bombing of his car in the al-Tadhamun neighborhood in Damascus.

On 22 January 2012, amidst a battle in the suburb of Douma, two officers, a soldier of the Syrian Army and a deserter were killed in the Talfita area.

Rural Damascus came under rebel control. At the police hospital in Harasta, the staff said most of rural Damascus was not controlled by the government forces and gunmen were kidnapping and killing those affiliated with the government in those areas. "Any car plate that belongs to the government cannot drive inside Harasta, we as doctors cannot go, they hijacked one of our cars a week ago," said a doctor.

According to the Syrian government, Brigadier General Hassan al-Ibrahim and a first lieutenant were killed when their car was fired on in the Damascus countryside.

==== Syrian Army offensive ====
On 27 January 2012, the Syrian army stormed Douma.

On 28 January 2012, seven more soldiers died around Damascus amidst the offensive. They were ambushed. Later SANA reported that the bus was ambushed near Douma, and it was carrying army officers, in which seven of the officers died.

On 29 January 2012, the Syrian army launched an offensive, trying to retake some of the Damascus suburbs from rebel control. Amateur video appeared to show tanks rolling in to Al-Ghouta and Zamalka to the east. Al-Ghouta is historically known for being a hub of dissent against the Assad government, and the crackdown appeared to be an attempt "to avoid any Tahrir Square-style mass movements,". According to activists, 14 civilians and five opposition fighters were killed in shelling of neighbourhoods. 2,000 pro-Assad forces, 50 tanks, and armoured vehicles took part in the offensive. However, they met fierce resistance, and six government soldiers, including two officers, were killed and six wounded in the opposition-controlled suburb of Sahnaya when their bus was blown up by a remote-controlled bomb. Some activists claimed that the fighting in Damascus was not unusual, and there were not any tanks in the city, while others said that it was "the worst fighting around the capital in the 10-month uprising." Clashes were also reported near the Damascus airport, leading to its closure. "It's urban war. There are bodies in the street," one activist, speaking from Kfar Batna told Reuters. Other Damascus suburbs that have come under fire from heavy artillery and mortar rounds from government forces include Douma, Saaba, Arbin and Hamuriyeh, activists said. "The more the regime uses the army, the more soldiers defect," Ahmed al-Khatib, a local rebel council member on the Damascus outskirts, told the AFP news agency. A spokesperson for the rebel FSA, which at the time, had 40,000 men and whose leadership was in Turkey, said that the fighting came a day after "a large wave of defections," with 50 officers and soldiers turning their back on Assad. At least two generals and other "high-ranking officers" reportedly defected to the opposition.

After two days of clashes, oppositions and FSA sources confirmed that the Syrian army regained control of some of the eastern suburbs of Damascus from the rebels and started to make house-to-house checks and arrests. Hamouriyeh was taken by the Syrian government, as was Kfar Batna by the end of the clashes. FSA and government forces still fought in the suburb of Saqba, according to an activist. However, the Free Syrian army regained control of at least one suburb, Douma, and destroyed one tank and also killing three government snipers. Another 11 soldiers had been killed in the government offensive on the Al-Ghouta suburb, as well as six civilians.

On 30 January 2012, the fighting subsided as the Syrian army extended their control in Ghouta. The military also advanced through Saqba. An activist said that the FSA moved out of the suburbs and that the Syrian army arrested 200 opposition members in Hammourya. The death toll given by activists was 19 civilians and six FSA fighters, while the overall number of those killed in the previous three days, since fighting in the area started, was 100. After the fighting, the Free Syrian Army withdrew to unidentified positions within ten kilometers of Damascus.

On 31 January 2012, the Syrian army continued to advance in order to crush the last FSA pockets. The army fired into the air, as they advanced with tanks even beyond the positions from where the FSA withdrew. Activists stated that the suburbs were on unannounced curfew while others were allowed to flee. The army conducted arrests on suspected people in the district of Irbin. In some instances, curfews were defied by some citizens, who put up a large opposition flag in the centre of Damascus.

=== February 2012 ===
On 1 February 2012, the Syrian army extended their cleaning operations, with more troops moving into the mountainous area of Qalamoun, north of Damascus. Further north, the troops which took control of Rankous started to extend their control into farmland surrounding the city. In the eastern suburbs of Mesraba, activists reported that army snipers were positioned and that tanks were in the streets. During the fighting in Wadi Barada, located north-west of Damascus in the Rif Damashk governorate, the Local Committee of Coordination initially reported that 12 people, including six FSA fighters, were killed. Four of those died during a tank bombardment by the military in an attempt to flush out the Free Syrian Army units operating in the area. A rebel spokesman put the death toll at 15. Later, the death toll of FSA fighters in the area was raised to 14 by the activist group. The opposition activist group also wrongly stated that the government poisoned the water supply of Wadi Barada; however, there was no independent confirmation and no other media reported the claim. One other FSA fighter was reportedly killed in fighting in the suburb of Moadhamieh. The towns of Deir Kanoun and Ein al Fija were also under army assaults according to the London-based Syrian Observatory for Human Rights. Syria's state news agency SANA said a general, Rajeh Mahmoud, was killed along with three other soldiers on the outskirts of Damascus.

Saqba, a working-class eastern suburb city of Damascus, had amidst peaceful anti-government demonstrations shortly fallen into control of a dozen armed and masked fighters from the Free Syrian Army (FSA). FSA also tried to resist against retaking by the Syrian army, but was later purged. The fighting stopped after the soldiers cleared the area street by street. Checkpoints were manned at main intersections and FSA fighters had either fled or been killed or wounded in the fighting. Damage was visible in the streets. Bodies of killed civilians were found severely mutilated, some with their hands bound. A resident told that he saw tanks firing into shops and talked about Iranian and Hezbollah involvement while there was no evidence for it. Others vowed to continue to protest once the soldiers left. Another resident blamed the FSA for provoking a fight they could not win and said that ordinary people were paying the price of the fighting, fearing more fighting in the future.

A Lebanese source close to the Syrian government said that the offensive had the goal of cleansing all the areas near the capital from rebels and setting up a security zone. An opposition activist named Ayman Idlibi stated that the Syrian army was preparing a massive attack on the city of Zabadani, a city located north of Wadi Barada and west of Rankus.

On 2 February 2012, it was confirmed that the Syrian Army had retaken Douma, with its streets mostly deserted, a few days earlier. Army defectors and most families had fled into the Damascus countryside.

On 9 February 2012, seven soldiers were buried after being killed fighting in the Damascus suburbs and other areas.

On 10 February 2012, the FSA in a poor district of Damascus city engaged loyalist forces in a firefight. Members of the Free Syrian Army fought for four hours with armoured backed troops who entered the al-Qaboun neighbourhood in the north of the capital according to witnesses; it was not immediately known how many people were killed but several FSA fighters were wounded.

On 11 February 2012, more fighting was reported when SANA reported that three gunmen shot dead another army general. SANA said that General Issa al-Khouli was shot in the morning as he left his home in the Damascus neighborhood of Rukn-Eddine. He was the director of a military hospital in Damascus. The Revolution Leadership Council, an anti-Assad group in Damascus, alleged that the government had carried out the killing itself. Meanwhile, fighting was reported in the suburb of Douma, while a video was posted online reportedly showing a tank firing its guns in the streets of Douma. More fighting in Douma was reported when soldiers stormed the Grand Mosque and detained a number of people who were inside. In the al-Qaboun clashes the day before, it was said that an activist in the area was shot dead by government forces.

On 12 February 2012, a video was posted on the internet reportedly showing a Syrian military anti-aircraft vehicle being used in the streets of Douma with pictures of Bashar al-Assad pasted on the front next to the guns; the vehicle appears to be firing directly at buildings. On 14 February, the Syrian press agency stated that the security forces discovered an insurgent hiding place and confiscated weapons, bomb-making kits and military suits. Also, an activist group reported the death of three insurgents. On 15 February, elite Syrian troops launched a large operation in the Barzeh suburb to locate the insurgents' hiding place, with around 1,000 troops deployed.

On 15 February 2012, with clashes ongoing, FSA were seen on the streets of Damascus.

On 18 February 2012, a military hideout was discovered in Douma as reported by state media, with the security forces finding six Kalashnikov assault rifles, three sniper rifles, two RPGs, two Turkish guns, and a Turkish shotgun. On the same day at least two protesters were reportedly killed in a bigger protest and funeral march for three recently slain protesters. In the central district of Mezzeh, near the Syrian Presidential Palace, the anti-government demonstration reportedly attracted tens of thousands of pro-democracy protesters. Security forces then confronted them with gunfire and tear gas, which was said to have killed and injured protesters. The number of dead rose to three. The number of protesters was estimated up to 30,000.

On 19 February 2012, the area was calm, even though the opposition called for an even bigger "day of defiance" following the protests a day before. As no one turned up, the opposition then claimed that protests could not go on due to security forces being deployed in some districts of central Damascus. The streets of Mezzeh became largely empty, and groups of people on the street were controlled on sight, with some arrests. Student protests at local schools did occur, however.

=== March 2012 ===
On 3 March 2012, the head of the Free Syrian Army, Riad al-Asaad, told al-Jazeera that FSA members had taken control of arms depots in Reef Damascus. He also stated that "the FSA killed more than 100 army troops in Reef Damascus." However, this was not confirmed by any media or the opposition groups responsible for tracking fatalities in the conflict as the sheer number would be counter-productive. Riad al-Asaad's statement was made after a claim by another FSA leader that 100 soldiers were killed or wounded when the FSA seized control of the bases. The FSA leader had said the report was preliminary before it was confirmed by the commander of the FSA. Two rebels and seven people harbouring them were killed by the Syrian Army in Duma, an activist stated to the news agencies. On 10 March, two soldiers and three rebels were killed in a clash in the town of Daryaa, the London activist group reported.

On 11 March 2012, London-based SOHR reported that 19 soldiers were killed in Idlib and the Damascus countryside. Seven of them were reported dead in Idlib, meaning the remaining 12 were killed outside Damascus. The following day, three rebels were killed in the areas.

On 11 March 2012, SANA claimed a colonel was assassinated in the Damascus countryside. He was shot while heading to his military unit, causing his death instantly.

On 12 March 2012, major clashes were reported in central Damascus between the FSA and Loyalist army for the first time. Battles erupted in the Rukn Al-Din area in central Damascus. Gunshots were heard throughout the city, according to witnesses.

On 16 March 2012, heavy fighting was reported in several Damascus suburbs, with the FSA fighting loyalist forces in those areas. Three soldiers were reported killed. This came before a car bombing, the third in Damascus which was claimed to have killed 27 people and wounded another 140. Among the dead were members of the security forces, as the bombs targeted an air force intelligence base and a criminal security centre.

On 18 March 2012, heavy street fighting ensued in Damascus, with the main district of Mezze being the battleground between the FSA and the military. The district is home to many security installations and residents reported hearing heavy machine gun and rocket-propelled grenade fire through the night. State controlled media claimed two rebels and one member of the security forces were killed in the fighting. "These clashes were the most violent and the closest to the security force headquarters in Damascus since the outbreak of the Syrian revolution," said Rami Abdulrahman, who runs the British-based Syrian Observatory for Human Rights. He said 18 government soldiers were wounded in the shooting. Details of the fighting emerged later. According to the Sunday Times, the fighting ended with a senior Sunni general, who had made it clear that he wished to defect to the FSA, and his family being escorted from their home under the protection of the rebels. The leader of this force said that three units of the FSA had launched an attack on Mezze at zero hour to secure the defecting general. Mezze is said to be home to Syria's wealthy elite and is the capital's most secure neighborhood, with embassies, armed guards and gated compounds. Two units of ten men each were sent to secure the general, while a third larger unit assaulted Mezze Villas west, an area of Mezze where the house of Assef Shawkat, the brother-in-law of President Bashar al-Assad and deputy head of the armed forces, is situated. Witnesses described heavy machine gunfire and RPGs being fired in the pre-dawn assault. A commander of the FSA said, "we wanted to show the regime we are capable of launching operations in the middle of their home, just a few [miles] from the presidential palace. People think nothing is happening in Damascus, but it is boiling." By the end, the army sent in armed helicopters to subdue the clashes, killing seven opposition fighters, according to the FSA. Also, 80 elements of the security forces including pro-government militia members were reportedly killed and 200 wounded during the clashes. The deputy commander of the Free Syrian Army also said that two military tanks were destroyed during the operation.

On 20 March 2012, the Free Syria Army in Douma released an army general they had detained in return for several prisoners and the bodies of those killed recently by security forces.

On 21 March 2012, Assad's forces shelled the suburbs of Harasta and Irbin.

On 24 March 2012, after eight protesters were wounded in a protest in Damascus, "very violent" clashes broke out in the Damascus area. Activists reported that explosions and small arms fire could be heard across a large part of Damascus province and in districts of the city itself, as anti-government protests were staged in Douma and Artuz close to the capital. The Observatory for Human Rights reported snipers and heavy armour in Douma.

On 26 March 2012, three soldiers were killed as a military bus was attacked in Harasta.

On 27 March 2012, The chief of the Air Force intelligence branch in Syria was reportedly killed, according to opposition forces in an attack in Damascus. The chief, Col Iyad Mando, was considered to be the head of one of the most powerful bodies of the state.

On 30 March 2012, the FSA captured an Air Force general in Damascus. Also, in the suburbs of Harasta and Irbin, opposition fighters were said to have fired RPGs at military buildings, killing at least one soldier.

== Aftermath ==
=== April 2012 ===
On 6 April 2012, the army invaded Douma and killed a civilian. Serious fighting began after this in Douma.

==== Cease-fire (from 14 April until 1 June 2012) ====
Sporadic incidents occurred in Damascus and in Rif Damascus Governorate during the cease-fire. Following the collapse of the cease-fire due to continued attacks by independent opposition rebel groups, the area became the scene of the Summer 2012 Damascus clashes.

On 18 April 2012, the government claimed that an army officer, a lieutenant colonel, had been shot dead in Douma.

On 21 April 2012, an officer, a first lieutenant, was allegedly shot dead in the Damascus countryside.

On 25 April 2012, three military officers were killed in Damascus, according to the opposition and government in the area.

On 28 April 2012, after a suicide bombing rocked Damascus, state media claimed 11 security forces and civilians had died. SOHR reported that two of the deaths were civilians, meaning nine security forces were killed.

On 28 April 2012, the SOHR claimed that the Syrian Army killed ten rebels in the Damascus region. These deaths were reported after a Syrian opposition group reported that hundreds of soldiers defected from the Syrian armed forces on Sunday in the outskirts of Damascus and Lattakia. This, though, could not be verified.

On 29 April 2012, state media reported that two Syrian border guards of the army had been killed in fighting in the Damascus countryside.

On 30 April 2012, Brigadier General Shaker Tayjon was killed by a bomb blast in the Damascus countryside according to state media. Another officer, a lieutenant colonel was allegedly killed by a separate bomb. The director of a military hospital told Sky News that 10 to 15 dead soldiers were arriving every day and the same number were being treated for injuries sustained in the fighting. These figures only included incidents in the capital and southern Syria. In the hospital, a dead soldier who had been killed in Douma was brought in and a wounded army general who had lost his leg was shown.

=== May 2012 ===
On 2 May 2012, In Harasta, near Damascus, six members of the security forces were killed during clashes with armed opposition, according to SOHR.

On 3 May 2012, seven soldiers and one rebel were killed.

On 9 May 2012, seven members of a pro-government militia called the Shabiha were killed when their bus was destroyed with rocket-propelled grenades on the edge of Irbin, a Damascus suburb. An activist said that army tanks began to shell the suburb afterwards.

On 13 May 2012, an army colonel and other officers were reported killed.

On 24 May 2012, a lieutenant colonel was shot and killed according to the Syrian government. Five police officers and four workers were also allegedly killed during the course of the day in a battle.

=== June 2012 ===
==== End of cease-fire on 1 June 2012) ====
On 1 June 2012, following the ongoing killing of Army personnel, the Army restarted their cleansing operations, killing five people during raids in the town of Daraya outside the capital Damascus, the London-based SOHR reported. They stormed the town, a center for the armed opposition, with tanks and fired shells at its western districts, the SOHR said. Local activists said the five killed were civilians, adding that one of them was an activist and "regime forces burnt his body completely after they killed him."

On 2 June 2012, eight soldiers were killed on the outskirts of Damascus by the FSA.

On 9 June 2012, in Damascus, residents spoke about a night of shooting and explosions in the worst violence Syria's capital has seen since the uprising against President Bashar al Assad's government began 15 months ago. The nearly 12 hours of fighting in Damascus suggested a new boldness among armed rebels, who previously kept a low profile in the capital.

On 10 June 2012, three police officers were killed when a bomb exploded, destroying their vehicle. Also, around 600 Syrian Free Army fighters simultaneously attacked government targets and Syrian army targets from five directions around the capital, in the biggest and most organised attack on Damascus at the time. One source reported that several Russians working with the Syrian government were killed and others wounded.

In early June, rebels attacked Shabiha buses brought to quell protests in Qaboun, killing 20 Shabiha men and prompting forces from the nearby Air Force Intelligence compound to fire anti-aircraft guns and heavy mortar rounds into the district, according to opposition campaigners. YouTube footage released by opposition activists also showed army trucks and soldiers in combat gear inside the Abbasid Football Stadium in the city, which has become a base for troops and Shabiha men confronting the opposition neighbourhoods of Jobar, Zamalka and Irbin just to the east.

On 16 June 2012, three opposition fighters were allegedly killed in Douma and a large number of others arrested when authorities raided their hideouts, SANA, state TV media, reported.

On 17 June 2012, the Syrian military once again attacked Damascus suburbs. Seven civilians, including three women, were killed in the shelling of Douma, an opposition stronghold. Five civilian men were killed in Saqaba, the London-based SOHR said, adding some of them had been "slaughtered" with knives. SOHR called for independent investigation as "this kind of killing has become common in recent weeks." In the suburb of Irbin a man and his wife and child were hit by an artillery shell fired by the Syrian army.

The Syrian government claimed they killed a man who had participated in rigging car bombs in Damascus.

Widespread clashes were reported in Douma and Harasta with one general of the Syrian army and a police captain being killed by the FSA. The dead Lieutenant General Ghassan Khalil Abu al-Dhahab was shot and killed in Douma.

On 21 June 2012, according to the toll compiled by the London-based organization, 30 civilians were killed in the opposition bastion of Douma by the Syrian Army.

On 25 June 2012, 11 soldiers were captured by the FSA in Damascus.

On 26 June 2012, rebels reportedly blew up an artillery piece at the entrance to Qudsaya, a Damascus suburb, with clashes taking place in both Qudsaya and al-Hama, about eight kilometers from the center of Damascus. The army also stormed the neighbourhood of Barzeh amid fierce fighting. The SOHR group reported that the government had massacred residents in al-Hama, and at least 14 people were reported killed.

On 27 June 2012, a pro-government media station was attacked, killing seven people, four from the security services and three journalists, while 13 rebels were killed near Douma according to the Syrian government.

On 29 June 2012 the latest development came as an activist reported a "massacre" in the Damascus suburb of Douma, about 15 km (9 miles) outside the capital Damascus. Heavy shelling was evident as the military tried to enter the suburb. 51 people were reportedly killed, including ten who tried to flee the suburb but were stopped at a checkpoint by militiamen and executed.

A resident of the city meanwhile stated to the press that the city of Douma, in the suburbs of Damascus, had effectively become a ghost city, with most of its 200,000 population forced to flee as a result of rebels seizing the area with consequent army shelling. He also reported hearing explosions for more than a week from shelling in the suburb of Harasta, which resulted in the collapse of ordinary life in Damascus. Security forces enforced an unofficial curfew after 7:00 or 8:00 p.m. when Shabiha militias arrest anyone wandering around the streets.

On 29 June 2012, the Syrian Army continued its crackdown against the rebels in Douma, killing scores of rebels and arresting a number of others. They claimed that three rebel deaths were confirmed.

On 30 June 2012, it was reported that the military had regained control of Douma after a ten-day military offensive. Loyalists battled to control the ring of suburbs and settlements in the surrounding countryside. The army launched frequent offensives into the suburbs only to see them slip back into rebel control after leaving. Human rights groups said that conditions in Douma are miserable, with dead bodies in the streets. There is a lack of food, electricity and running water. The army was accused of damaging hospitals that treated the wounded in Douma and carrying out waves of mass arrests and also the execution of rebels.

On 30 June 2012, in Douma, the Syrian Army said that they seized three rebels' weapons stores and a rebel explosive factory used for terror attacks, where dozens of rebels were killed while many others were arrested. SANA reported that dozens of rebels were killed while many others were arrested.

Residents also reported that the army, after weeks of intensive shelling, finally managed to push its way into the former rebel-controlled Douma city center and was sweeping streets in search of rebel fighters, who, according to other residents, withdrew from the city the night before, after a ten-day government offensive. Residents also reported decaying dead bodies lying in the streets and the arrest of hundreds of citizens to check on their involvement with the rebels. Most were later released.

An ITV reporter filmed a Syrian military funeral for soldiers killed during the siege of Douma. 42 soldiers were killed in the siege of Douma, most of them in the last day and a half when the Syrian army entered Douma after having shelled the city for days. Over 200 people were killed overall, with at least 25 women being raped by the Syrian Army in front of their families. One particular case that was documented by Women Under Siege was the case of a young woman whose apartment building was entered by the elite republican guard, and all residents taken out. They executed eight male residents and brutally raped the young woman.

=== July 2012 ===
On 1 July 2012, it was reported that 85 people had been killed by a car bomb in an attack on an anti-government demonstration, which started out as a funeral for a previous protester that had been killed by government soldiers. The car bomb had targeted the funeral march. Video footage appeared on the internet showing the explosions and aftermath. An initial false report by the UK-based SOHR said that it was the government that killed at least 30 civilian protesters in this attack.

On 2 July 2012, an ITV News correspondent managed to get to the Irbeen suburb of Damascus with the help of FSA fighters and confirmed that it and several other suburbs, including Zamalka, were completely out of government control with local rebel fighters patrolling the streets openly. It was also falsely reported that fighting in Douma was still ongoing.

On 10 July 2012, two soldiers were killed when their military supply vehicle was destroyed in southern Damascus.

On 11 July 2012, there was heavy fighting in the Damascus neighbourhood of Zabdin, where members of the FSA attacked a missile base, prompting the defection of at least 27 soldiers there. Clashes, raids and shelling also continued in Irbeen, Douma, Zamalka and Kafarsoussah.

On 12 July 2012, the Syrian Army shelled areas of Damascus for the first time. Artillery fired several shells towards orchards in the Kfar Souseh district where FSA was reportedly hiding. There were also clashes in New Artouz suburb, some 15 km (9.3 mi) from Damascus.

On 14 July 2012, a major escalation in Damascus reportedly took place from 14 to 15 July, when a coordinated attack by multiple rebel forces was begun in Damascus neighbourhoods.

On 15 July 2012, fierce fighting was reported in some quarters of central Damascus as the army moved in to dislodge rebels. The rebels fighting were the ones who were crushed in Douma and other suburbs and fled to Damascus itself. Fighting also closed the road leading from central Damascus to the airport.

On 16 July 2012, for a second day, heavy clashes in the southern Midan and Tadhamon districts of Damascus raged with the military managing to surround the rebel forces in the area and sending tanks and other armored vehicles into the neighborhoods. The rebels called the clashes a raid by them against the capital, while the government called it a 48-hour military operation to clear the area of any opposition forces. There were also indications that the government knew about the planned rebel raid and acted on the information.

On 17 July 2012, shooting was reported in one of the main central streets and machine-gun fire was reported in nearby Sabaa Bahrat Square, site of the Central Bank of Syria, which was the scene of several major pro-government demonstrations. Fighting was ongoing in the southern Midan and Kfar Sousa districts and the northern Barzeh and Qaboun districts. There were contradictions among the rebels themselves on the nature of the conflict.

One FSA commander claimed that the battle for "liberation" of Damascus had begun, with another dubbing it Operation Damascus Volcano.

Tarek, the rebel spokesman in Damascus, dismissed the claims, however, stating the clashes were still only skirmishes. He also said the FSA didn't start the battle, in line with earlier reports that the military made a preemptive strike on the opposition forces after learning of their plan for the attack on the capital.

On 18 July 2012, a bombing targeted the national security headquarters where Assad's most senior generals, known collectively as the "crisis cell", were meeting. Four were killed: Defense Minister Dawoud Rajiha, Deputy Head of Armed Forces Assef Shawkat, General Hasan Turkmani and National Security Chief Hisham Ikhtiyar.

Fighting resumed with the Rif Dimashq offensive (August–October 2012).
