= Battle of Zabadani (2015) =

2015 battle of the Syrian Civil War

Coordinates: 33.7250°N 36.0972°E

- Part of the Syrian Civil War
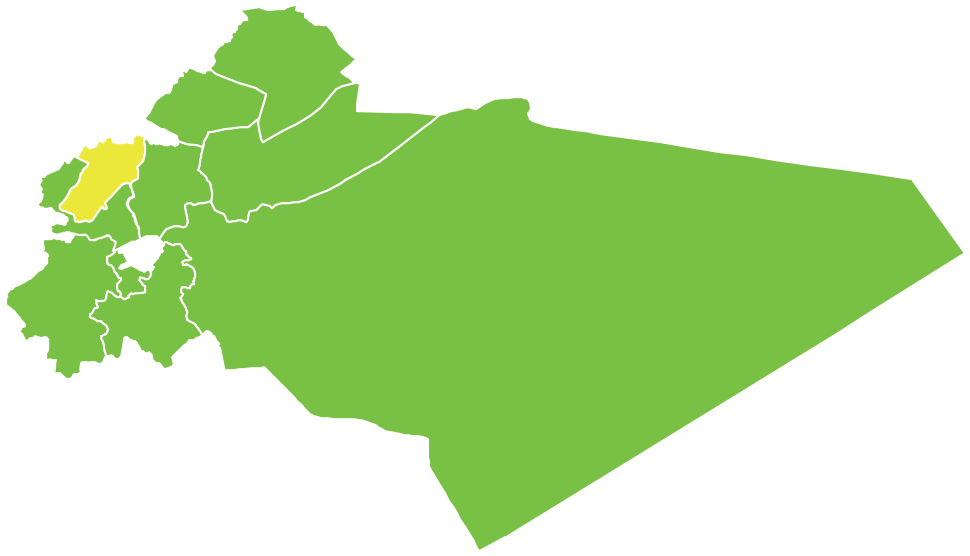
- Zabadani District (yellow) within the Rif Dimashq Governorate
Date	3 July – 24 September 2015 (2 months and 3 weeks)
Location	Al-Zabadani and outskirts, Rif Dimashq, Syria
Status	Ceasefire; Significant Syrian Army and Hezbollah gains: Rebel forces besieged in Al-Zabadani after 4 July 2015; The Syrian Army and Hezbollah control 85% of the city, per Syrian Army sources; The Syrian Army and Hezbollah control 70–75% of the city, per opposition sources; A Turkish/Iranian brokered U.N.-agreement is enacted on 24 September 2015

Belligerents
Syrian Opposition; Jaysh al-Haramoun; Al-Nusra Front; Ahrar ash-Sham; Free Syrian Army; Islamic Front (Joined 15 August)	(Syria) Syrian Government; Iran; Syrian Social Nationalist Party; Hezbollah; Al-Jabalawi Battalion; Palestine Liberation Army

Commanders and leaders
Abdel-Rahman Kharita †; Zahran Alloush	(Ba'athist Syria) Lt. Gen. Ali Abdullah Ayyoub (Iran) Gen. Abdel Karim Rubash † (Iran) Qasem Soleimani; Mustafa Badreddine

Units involved
Free Syrian Army; (Syria) Al-Zabadani Hawks Brigade; Islamic Front; Jaysh al-Islam	Syrian Armed Forces; Syrian Army; 4th Armoured Division; 63rd Brigade; 67th Brigade; Syrian Air Force; National Defense Force; IRGC; Quds Force; Eagles of the Whirlwind

Strength
1,500–2,000 fighters	(Ba'athist Syria) Unknown

Casualties and losses
400+ fighters killed 100–250 wounded 189 captured (independently confirmed); 479+ fighters killed (pro-government claim)	60–108 Hezbollah killed 29 SAA killed 2 SSNP killed (Palestine) 1 PLA killed 1 IRGC killed

The Battle of Zabadani (2015) started in early July 2015 during the Syrian Civil War as a military offensive launched by the Syrian Army and Hezbollah to capture the rebel-held town of Al-Zabadani.

== Background ==
Prior attempts at negotiating a peaceful outcome between the government and the rebels in Zabadani failed.

== The battle ==
=== Zabadani surrounded ===
On 3 July 2015 Hezbollah and the Syrian Army launched an offensive against Zabadani and reportedly seized Qalaat Al-Tal hill. The following day, they broke into Zabadani and reportedly captured the southwestern part of the city, specifically the Jamiyat neighborhood. News reports indicated that many civilians fled the city. On 5 July, it was reported that the rebels mined and fortified their positions inside the besieged city ahead of expected heavy street fighting.

By 9 July, the Syrian Army and Hezbollah controlled half of Zabadani following six days of clashes. On the same day, the Syrian Army carried out a powerful assault on al-Nusra Front's positions in the village of Al-Zahra, next to Zabadani. They captured a number of points while under the cover of the Syrian Air Force's airstrikes. By 12 July, Hezbollah reportedly advanced deep into Zabadani, capturing Al-Zahra Castle, the majority of the western part of the city and the Al-Zalah neighborhood in the south of Zabadani.

On 13 July, Syrian government forces captured the Hay al-Sultani neighborhood in the southeastern part of the town, thus closing Zabadani's southern entrance and cutting of the town from nearby Madaya. According to the Hezbollah-affiliated Al-Manar television station, 200 rebels, 16 government soldiers and 12 Hezbollah fighters had been killed since the start of the battle, while another 43 rebels were captured. On 14 July, government troops destroyed a 360-meter tunnel passing under the main highway linking Zabadani and the village of Madaya. During the day, the Army seized the Kahraba roundabout and al-Hakl al-Asfar Street, reinforcing its control of Zabadani's entrance. Before nightfall, government forces captured a collection of empty villas along Jamal ‘Abdel-Nasser Street that were being used by the rebels.

By 15 July, the Syrian Army and Hezbollah were advancing towards the center of Zabadani and had effectively encircled rebel forces in the town. Hezbollah and the Syrian Army’s 63rd Brigade of the 4th Mechanized Division issued the rebels an ultimatum to "surrender or die". It was reported on 16 July, that the Syrian Army's and Hezbollah's grip of Zabadani had tightened, after a failed rebel attempt to counterattack Hezbollah in the southern part of the town, along with dwindling rebel supply lines. It was also reported that dozens of al-Nusra Front fighters had begun to surrender to government forces.

On 18 July, the Syrian Army claimed that an SAA ambush killed more than 40 rebels in Zabadani. The following day, three rebel fighters were killed by Army snipers in a failed attempt to infiltrate the besieged city. By this point, according to the pro-opposition group the SOHR, the Army and Hezbollah had managed to take wide sections of Jamiyat, as well as parts of the northwest and southeast of the city, fully besieging it, but had still not managed to fully take control of Zabadani.

On 21 July, Syrian government troops captured the Zabadani plains, while continuing to search for al-Nusra's main supply tunnel between Zabadani and Madaya. At this stage, the military was still unable to enter the Old Town area of Zabadani, where rebel forces had barricaded themselves. This was due to the mountainous area, that most of the rebels were local fighters who are familiar with the city, the closeness of rebel supply lines and due to a single rebel command. Since the start of the offensive on Zabadani, 600 barrel bombs were dropped on the town. The next day, government forces further advanced in the city after rebels withdrew from some areas due to heavy airstrikes and shelling. They also reportedly captured the Barada-Zabadani road.

On 22 July, Syrian government forces made more advances in Zabadani's outskirts, after a military push from the plains. The next day, the Army reiterated their "surrender or die" ultimatum to the rebels, saying it was their final warning, as government forces reportedly captured the village of Al-Marawah, near Madaya. On the night between 24 and 25 July, the rebels launched a surprise attack and reportedly seized several government checkpoints. On 25 July, the rebels trapped inside Zabadani issued a statement urging assistance from other rebel groups, while also accusing the UN and Staffan de Mistura's team of collaborating with Bashar al-Assad. By this point, the remaining 1,200 rebels were trapped in a space about three kilometres by three kilometres.

On 30 July, 30 rebel fighters were reportedly killed in combat, with the SAA and the Hezbollah attempting to push the rebels to the east of Barada Street and get closer to Zabadani's downtown area. The previous day, the city had been pounded by 40 airstrikes by the SAAF. By 3 August, the rebel controlled areas of Zabadani had diminished considerably. The same day the SAA and the Hezbollah captured the Mahata Neighborhood after a three-hour battle. Government sources report that the SAA had hit Al-Zabadani with over 300 missiles and mortar shells that day. Government forces were now reportedly progressing towards encircling the downtown area. By 4 August, the rebels had lost more territory, and Syrian government sources announced that the final assault on Al-Zabadani was merely days away.

=== Urban clashes and ceasefires ===
On 5 August, reports surfaced that one of the rebel groups were, via an intermediary in the Lebanese Government, attempting to negotiate a secure withdrawal for their fighters in exchange for safe passage to 30,000 civilians trapped inside the towns of Al-Fou’aa and Kafraya. SOHR also reported that pro-government forces had made further advances. However, the next day it was reported that negotiations had failed and pro-government troops had made further advances into the city's core with fights now taking place inside the downtown area. By 7 August, the rebels had lost more territory as well as 19 fighters, with al-Nusra and the FSA now entrenched at Hikmat Street.

On 8 August, the Syrian government forces announced they had breached the rebel's defense line and entered Zabadani's downtown area, capturing the central bus station. Troops also destroyed a Command and Control Center, thus eliminating the rebels' ability to communicate with their armed combatants. On 9 August, The NDF and Hezbollah were reportedly merely metres away from the city centre. If captured, the government forces anticipate the end of the rebel insurgency in the city.

On 10 August, pro-Syrian government forces captured the Imam Ali Mosque, with the Hezbollah pressing on from the southern perimeter. SOHR reported that negotiations are still taking place between the parties. The following day, a 48-hour ceasefire was brokered by Iranian mediators. During this time, fighters would be allowed to leave the city by bus, but there was some contention amongst some rebel groups as to whether or not to accept the settlement. However, the fragile ceasefire was broken by the rebels from the al-Nusra Front merely hours later. The government forces were reportedly now in control of nearly 75% of Al-Zabadani. According to Al-Manar, 40 Islamist rebel fighters surrendered themselves to the Syrian Armed Forces and Hezbollah on 13 August.

On 15 August, the ceasefire officially ended, with the Syrian government then reportedly in control of 85% of the city. The rebels, being encircled, were said to be relying on tunnels for their transportation of supply and manpower. Shortly afterwards, negotiations between the government and the rebels failed following a disagreement on the number of rebel captives to be released from government-held prisons.

On 17 August, the SAA and the Hezbollah captured 46 buildings, killing 16 rebels in the process midst heavy aerial bombardment. Following their advancement, the government forces issued the rebels with the final ultimatum of surrendering or preparing for their last stand. The ultimatum given to the rebels was set for 72 hours and would lapse on 20 August, and included a possibility of amnesty for surrendering rebel combatants. On 18 August, five rebel combatants reportedly surrendered in order to have their case tried before an amnesty council in Damascus, although most rebels were reported to still be holding out in the hopes of a deal being brokered by Turkish and Iranian mediators.

On 20 August, the Syrian government forces resumed their operations and launched their final assault on Al-Zabadani, killing 22 rebel fighters. By the end of the day, pro-governmental sources claimed the rebels had lost all but one remaining square kilometer of territory. Pro-government advances were confirmed by SOHR on 23 August amid further clashes in the city. On 24 August, pro-government sources reported that the SAA and the Hezbollah had captured the Umar Al-Farouq Mosque and surrounding residential buildings after fierce firefights, killing over 15 combatants from Harakat Ahrar Al-Sham and Jabhat Al-Nusra. On 26 August, SOHR confirmed the government advancements.

A new 48-hour ceasefire, once again brokered by Iranian and Turkish mediators, was declared on 26 August. Negotiations between the parties would ensue during the ceasefire. The ceasefire, however, was postponed a day until 28 August, due to disagreements regarding prisoner exchange. The stipulations of the effective ceasefire were that the rebels would be allowed to evacuate wounded combatants while the Syrian government would be allowed to supply humanitarian aid to the towns of Kafraya and Al-Fou’aa, both of which are Syrian government-held but besieged by rebel forces. There would also be a prisoner exchange of non-combatant between the parties. However, on the following day, it was reported that the rebels had broken the ceasefire by shelling Kafraya and Al-Fou’aa. Pro-government sources claimed eight rebels had surrendered during the brief ceasefire. On 31 August, Syrian government forces moved in on the adjacent rebel-held town of Madaya, reportedly capturing 25% of it, while continuing aerial bombardment of Al-Zabadani.

On 2 September, Hezbollah and Syrian government forces had captured 70-75 % of al-Zabadani, while pro-government sources claimed that they had pushed the rebels back into a 100 square-meter area in the center of the town. On 3 September, the SAA and the Hezbollah were reported to be in their final push towards capturing the city, after having made several advances during the day. According to government sources, the army overrun a rebel field hospital and captured several buildings, killing 15 rebels in the process while 8 more surrendered. The advance pushed the remaining rebels back to a half dozen building blocks in Al-Zabadani. The advances were later confirmed by SOHR. Government sources would later revise the information regarding the remaining rebel-controlled territory as consisting of 250 square meters around the city-center.

On 5 September, pro-government sources stated that government troops had captured the Al-Nabwa’ Neighborhood in the northeastern sector of Al-Zabadani's downtown area, while killing 15 rebel combatants. The rebels had reportedly made new calls for Turkey to resume its role as a mediator in order to reopen negotiations between the parties. On 7 September, the Army reportedly advanced further, capturing the Dawar Al-Saylaan Neighborhood as well as the strategic bus station. This marked the first government presence in the Al-Zabadani bus station since 2011.

On 13 September, the rebels reportedly made an attempt to break the siege, making some advancements. However, the government later reported the rebels had been pushed back, leaving 18 rebel combatants dead and 11 captured. The captured rebels had reportedly given up the location of their comrades in exchange for a possibility of amnesty, which had allowed the government forces to capture eight street blocks in the Al-Nabua District.

On 17 September, the Army captured the Ayn al-Himma, Al-Maydani, Al-Kubra and Al-Adaima districts, and two days later, they had advanced further, capturing the al-Nabua district and killing 13 rebels in the process.

A third ceasefire was declared on 20 September, covering Al-Zabadani and the rebel-besieged government-held towns of Al-Fou’aa and Kafraya. However, government sources reported that rebel forces were still attacking Al-Fou’aa and Kafraya. The ceasefire lapsed on 21 September.

== Ceasefire agreement ==
On 24 September 2015, more than 2 months after the battle of Zabadani began, the UN announced that an agreement between the warring parties had finally been reached after repeated mediation efforts. Per the agreement, the remaining entrenched rebels are to withdraw from the government-besieged Zabadani and control of the town to the Syrian government while surrendering all weapons, save for light handguns, and withdrawing to the Idlib Governorate. Conversely, civilians (approximately 10,000 people) still remaining inside the rebel-besieged Shia villages of Fu'ah and Kefriya are to be evacuated. Control of the villages would not be surrendered to the rebels; however, as approximately 4,000 pro-government troops would remain in the villages. The plan was expected to take 6 months to be fully implemented, during which time extended ceasefires are expected to be upheld in each respective area. Evacuation of wounded from both sides was expected to begin as early as 25 September 2015. An additional stipulation denotes the release of 500 rebel captives from Syrian government-held prisons. The agreement would be overseen by the United Nations office in Damascus.

=== Implementation ===
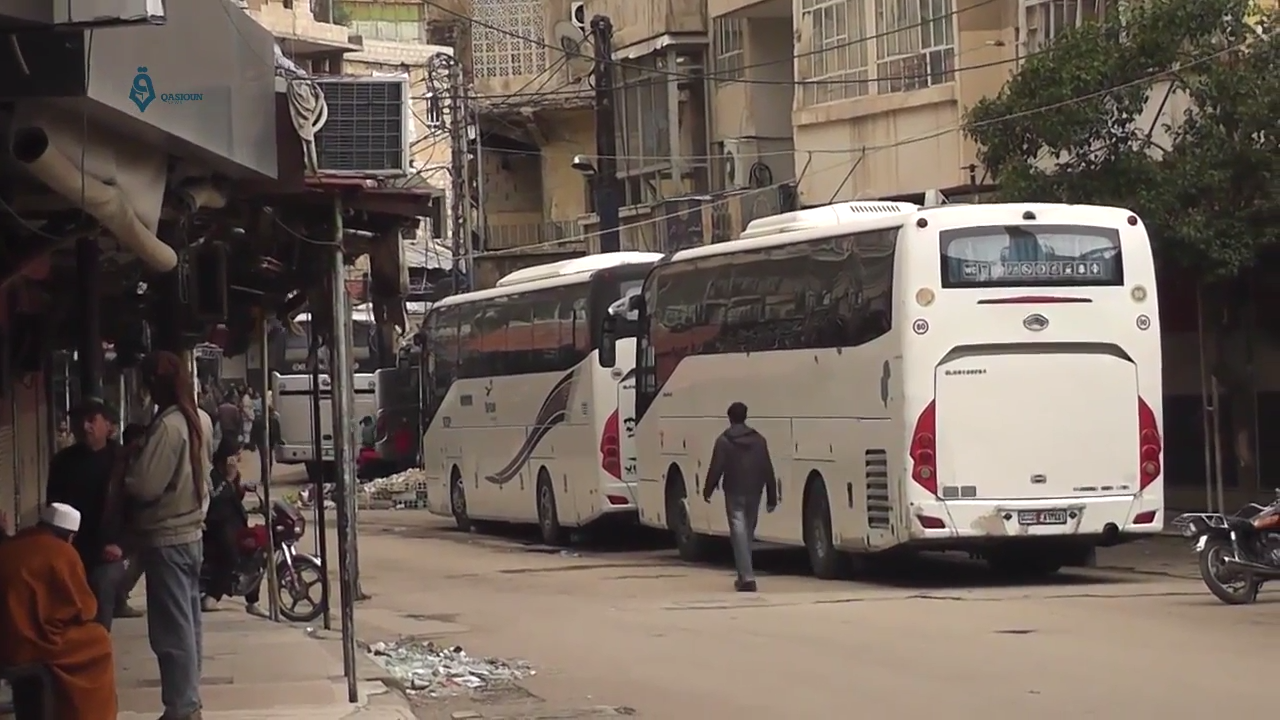
Buses prepare to transport people out of Madaya as part of the agreement on 14 April 2017

On 26 September 2015, the first bus transport evacuating the rebel combatants to Idlib began leaving al-Zabadani.

After the implementation of the ceasefire, the besieging Hezbollah and the Syrian Army troops redirected their attention towards the remaining parts of the Qalamoun Mountains still under rebel control, namely a smaller area in the Jaroud Rankous, located in southern Qalamoun, and larger area located in Jaroud Qarah, in northern Qalamoun. The Hezbollah also set itself out to recapture the Lebanese border-district of Arsal, from where the al-Nusra Front and ISIL have been receiving much of its reinforcement into the Qalamoun Mountains. However, on 10 October, the truce was jeopardized by rebel groups, claiming the truce had been made "irrelevant" following the Russian military intervention in the Syrian Civil War.

On 28 December, 120 rebels and civilians from Zabadani were transported to Lebanon in return for the evacuation of 300 pro-government troops and civilians from Fuah and Kefraya to Turkey. According to the ceasefire agreement, those from Zabadani will proceed to Turkey through Lebanon while those from Fuah and Kefraya will arrive in government-held Syria through Lebanon and Turkey.

A year later on 25 September 2016, 52 aid trucks went to Zabadani and Madaya and 19 arrived in Fuah and Kefraya. A week before on 18 September, Hezbollah and the Syrian Army destroyed a rebel smuggling tunnel near Zabadani containing rockets, mortar shells, and other weapons and ammunition.

On 23 November 2016, government forces launched mortar shells and sniper fire into Zabadani and Madaya, which killed 2 civilians.

On February 21, 2017, Rebel forces evacuated from the town of Serghaya.

On 28 March 2017, an agreement was brokered by Qatar and Iran for the evacuation of those living in Fu'ah and Kafriya in exchange for the evacuation of residents and rebels in Zabadani and Madaya. The agreement came under effect beginning on 12 April and buses and ambulances arrived in the four towns with the assistance of the Syrian Arab Red Crescent to begin the evacuations. On 14 April, 60 buses transported 2,350 people, including 400 rebels, from Madaya and Zabadani to Idlib. After being suspended for several days following a suicide bombing of buses carrying refugees, the first phase of the evacuations was completed on 19 April, with further transports planned for June. A total of 30,000 people are to be relocated by the end of the operation.

== See also ==
- Battle of Zabadani (2012)
- Qalamoun offensive (May–June 2015)
