= Al-Ibrahim =

Al-Ibrahim (Arabic: الابراهيم) is a patronymic derived from the given name Ibrahim. Notable people with this surname include:

- Abu Hashim al-Ibrahim, Iraqi islamist
- Al Jawhara bint Ibrahim Al Ibrahim, Saudi Arabian royal
- Ali Al-Ibrahim (born 1997), Saudi Arabian handball player
- Ammar Al-Ibrahim (born 2997), Saudi Arabian football player
- Hassan al-Ibrahim, Syrian soldier
- Ibrahim Al-Ibrahim (born 1992), Saudi Arabian football player
- Riyadh Al-Ibrahim (born 1993), Saudi Arabian football player
- Taibah Al-Ibrahim (1945–2011), Kuwaiti writer
- Waleed al-Ibrahim (born 1962), Saudi Arabian businessman and chairman of Middle East Broadcasting Center (MBC)
