= Rajeh Mahmoud =

Syrian Brigadier general (1959–2012)

Rajeh Mustafa Mahmoud
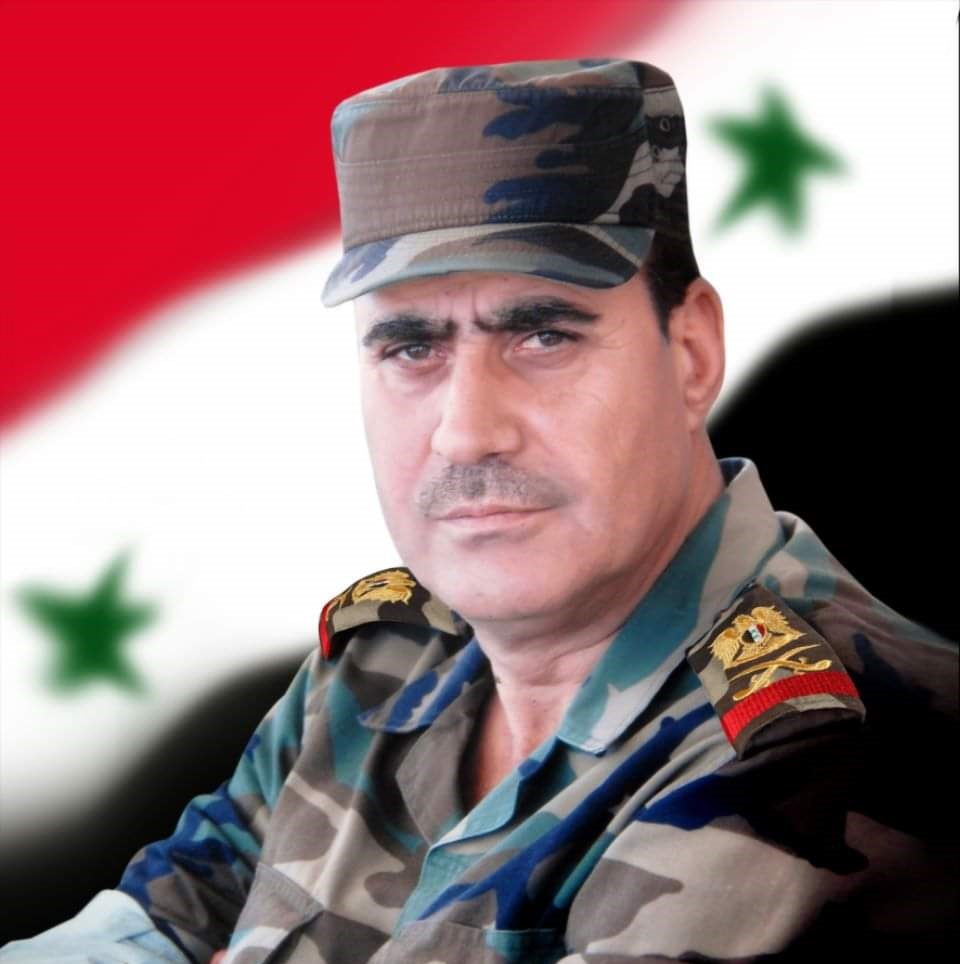
- Born: 15 January 1959; Umm al-Dawali, Homs Governorate, Syria
- Died: 1 February 2012 (aged 53); Damascus, Syria
- Military career
- Allegiance: Ba'athist Syria
- Branch: Syrian Army
- Rank: Major General
- Conflicts: Syrian civil war; Rif Dimashq clashes (November 2011–March 2012)

Rajeh Mustafa Mahmoud (Arabic: راجح مصطفى محمود) was a Syrian Major general who was commander of the military engineering unit of the Republican Guard (Syria). Mahmoud was born on 15 January 1959 in Umm al-Dawali village in Homs Governatore.

The Republican Guard of Syria is used to protect top Syrian government officials from any external threats. As one of the Guard's commanders, Major General Rajeh Mahmoud served as an official ceremonial guard of president Bashar al-Assad.

On 1 February 2012 State media reported that he and three of his soldiers were killed in a clash around Damascus on 1 February 2012. State media claimed "a number" of combatants were also killed.
