= Hassan al-Ibrahim =

Syrian general (died 2012)

Hassan Abdullah al-Ibrahim
- حسن عبد الله الابراهيم
- Died: 22 January 2012; Rif Dimashq, Syria
- Military career
- Allegiance: (Ba'athist Syria)
- Branch: Syrian Army
- Rank: Brigadier General
- Conflicts: Syrian Civil War; Rif Dimashq clashes (November 2011–March 2012)

Hassan Abdullah al-Ibrahim (Arabic: حسن عبد الله الابراهيم) was a Syrian Brigadier General who was shot and killed, along with a Lieutenant during the course of the Syrian Civil War, according to the state media. State media reported that his vehicle was fired upon when it entered Talfita, Rif Dimashq, and three other military officers were injured in the attack. A blurred photo of what was reportedly the body of the general was included in SANA's report. His death came after the death of Mohammed al-Awwad, another Brigadier General, almost a week before.
