= Battle of Zabadani (2012) =

Battle of the Syrian Civil War

Coordinates: 33.7250°N 36.0972°E

- Part of the 2011-12 Damascus clashes of the early insurgency phase of the Syrian civil war and Hezbollah involvement in the Syrian civil war
Date	7–18 January 2012 (First phase) (1 week and 4 days); 4–11 February 2012 (Second phase) (1 week)
Location	Zabadani, Rif Dimashq, Syria
Result	FSA/Rebel victory after the first phase, Syrian Army victory after the second phase: Free Syrian Army is left in control of the city and the adjoining town of Madaya in mid-January; Syrian Army retakes control of Madaya and takes control over Zabadani in mid-February

Belligerents
Syrian opposition	(Syria) Syrian government Hezbollah

Commanders and leaders
(Syrian opposition) Abu Adnan Muhammad Adnan Zaitoun	(Syria) Unknown

Units involved
(Syrian opposition) Free Syrian Army; (Syrian opposition) Hamza bin Abdulmuttalib Battalion	Syrian Armed Forces; Syrian Army; 3rd Armoured Division; 49th Armoured Brigade; 132nd Mechanised Brigade; 4th Armoured Division; 555th Airborne Regiment

Strength
250 FSA soldiers	1,000 soldiers 300 armored vehicles, 100 tanks (2nd phase) (opposition claim)

Casualties and losses
80+ killed	30 – 40 killed (opposition claim)
- 22 civilians killed (first phase) 100 killed (second phase)

The Battle of Zabadani took place in January through February 2012, during the Syrian civil war. During the initial stages of the battle, the rebel FSA took control of the town. However, less than a month later, the Syrian Arab Army retook control of Zabadani, forcing rebel fighters to withdraw towards the Lebanese border.

== Battle ==
=== First phase ===
The battle began when the city was stormed by the Syrian Army on 7 January 2012. This operation followed large-scale anti-government protests in the city and in the wider Rif Dimashq Governorate. An anti-government activist group claimed that 12 civilians including three children were killed when the town was bombarded by tanks in the initial operation.

Zabadani was once again stormed by the Syrian army on 13 January. However, their attack was repelled by the Free Syrian Army (FSA), which held control of large parts of the city. The Syrian army held its positions on the outskirts. Amateur video footage obtained by Reuters showed armed FSA fighters patrolling empty streets.

On 18 January, both sides agreed to a ceasefire. It was also agreed that the Syrian army would leave the city and that the FSA would remove its forces from the streets. A senior opposition figure, Kamal al-Labwani, said "I think stiff resistance and defections among the attacking forces have forced the regime to negotiate. We will see if it will stick to the deal". He claimed that 30 loyalist soldiers and an unknown number of defected soldiers had been killed during the battle on 13 January.

The ceasefire was temporarily broken on 30 January, when an FSA fighter was killed by Ba'athist government troops. However, by the end of the day, the situation at Zabadani still remained tense but calm.

A top Iranian Revolutionary Guard official said that Hezbollah forces took part in the fighting in Zabadani in January.

=== Second phase ===
On 4 February, it was reported by activists that the Syrian army was shelling the area with mortars and firing on FSA troops with heavy machine guns, and had started to storm Zabadani's outskirts. The Local Coordination Committees of Syria said that 300 armored vehicles, including 100 tanks were involved in the offensive. This report could not be verified independently. The SOHR, another activist source based in London, said to the AFP that hundreds of armored vehicles assaulted the city of Zabadani on 6 February. According to activist videos Zabadani was still under shelling on 7 February.

On 8 February, activists said that at least 10 residents had died from the shelling in recent days, and state media reported that four members of the special forces were killed outside of Zabadani. They claimed that a number of opposition forces were killed in the clash. It was also reported that during the fighting, a foreign jihadist, Abu Hamza al-Shami, was also killed. Two days later, several activists sources reported that the Syrian army took control of Madaya, a city located just a few kilometers south of Zabadani which was, according to the same activists, surrounded and under a renewed shelling from the army.

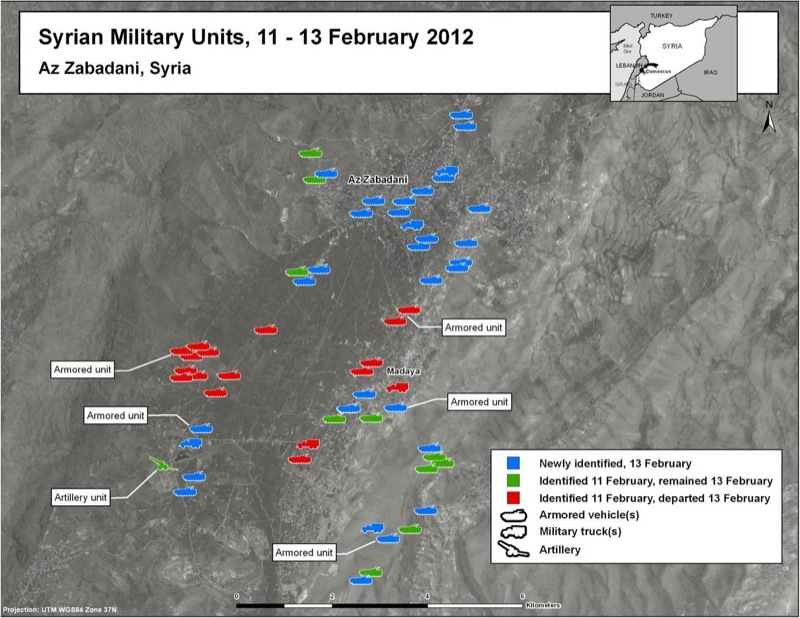
Military deployments in the vicinity of Az Zabadani between 11 and 13 February 2012

The Local Coordination Committees said that the army was heavily pounding the city for a 6th day in a row with 150 shells hitting the city, killing seven people and injuring 40. They added that the Syrian army was located as close as 300 meters south of the city entrance. The Committee estimated that 300 armored vehicles and 30,000 soldiers were involved in the battle, but it could not be confirmed and was highly unlikely.

On 11 February, the Syrian army entered Zabadani after a renewed shelling and seized parts of the town. An exiled Syrian activist in Jordan said that a ceasefire had been agreed in Zabadani and that the army entered the city. It stipulates that the army would not pursue the rebels if they hand over their stolen weapons. He added that 100 people were killed in the bombardment of the city.

On 13 February, activists reported that the Syrian army was conducting attacks and arrests in Zabadani and Madaya. A contact of Irish Times journalist told that the army had arrested some rebel fighters and allowed others to flee, with ongoing house to house conducted. Many residents fled to Bludan were the red cross sent an aid convoy. Footage of Zabadani was published on 13 February, on the Syrian State TV, showing interviews with residents and some of the weapons seized. A pro-rebel resident said that the Syrian army broke a deal by sending soldiers to take over the city and said that dozens of people suspected of being rebels had been captured.

Journalist John Ray and his cameraman made a video report about the battle, showing footage of the fighting and the advance of the Syrian army. The Army advanced from the city toward the hillsides where rebels were hiding, progressing and trapping the rebels against the Lebanon border. The opposition-affiliated L.C.C. claimed that the Syrian army had arrested 250 members of the opposition. A Lebanese smuggler told that the Syrian army had successfully cut the rebels supply lines in the city.

== Aftermath ==
=== Renewed fighting ===
A month later on 12 March, clashes were reported once again in Zabadani, with many being wounded. On 27 March, the military shelled the town again, which killed four residents. Two days later on 29 March, more fighting was reported in the town.

=== May stalemate ===
In May, much of Zabadani was once again reportedly out of SAA control, with army checkpoints on the roads leading into and out of the city and security forces guarding government buildings in the town, but not venturing outside to such places as the central square. Around 450 FSA fighters were in the orchards outside of Zabadani, but they didn't have a presence in the town itself. Instead, opposition activists were reporting from within the city via walkie-talkies and organizing protests.

== See also ==
- Rif Dimashq clashes (November 2011–March 2012)
- Battle of Zabadani (2015)
