= Idlib =

City in Syria

Idlib إِدْلِب
- City
- Idlib City Center Clock Tower, 2021
- Interactive map of Idlib
- Location of Idlib within Syria
- Coordinates: 35°56′N 36°38′E
- Country: Syria
- Governorate: Idlib
- District: Idlib
- Subdistrict: Idlib

Government
  - Governor: Mohammad Abdul Rahman

Area
  - Total: 23 km^{2} (8.9 sq mi)
- Elevation: 500 m (1,600 ft)

Population (2010 census)
  - Total: 165,000
- Demonym(s): English: Idlibian; Arabic: إدلبي, romanized: Idlibi
- Area code: 23
- Geocode: C3871
- Climate: Csa

Idlib (Arabic: إِدْلِب, romanized: ʾIdlib, pronounced [ʔid.lib]; also spelt Idleb or Edlib) is a city in northwestern Syria, and is the capital of the Idlib Governorate. It has an elevation of nearly 500 meters (1,600 ft) above sea level, and is 59 kilometers (37 mi) southwest of Aleppo. It is located near the border with Turkey.

== History ==
A Neolithic settlement dating back to 8500 BCE was identified at Tell Ain el-Kerkh, near Idlib. The Ebla tablets (2350 BCE) mention the city of 𒁺𒄷𒆷𒇥𒌝 (du-ḫu-la-bu_{6}-um "Duhulabum") which is most probably located at Idlib as suggested by Michael Astour and Douglas Frayne; a similarity exists between the sounds of the ancient and modern names. In the tablets, Duhulabuum is 22 km south of "Unqi" which might correspond to the modern village of Kaukanya/Kukaniyeh (Arabic: كوكانية), located approximately 22 km north of Idlib (see Dead Cities). Thutmose III also mentioned the city with the name Ytḥb.

=== Classical Antiquity ===
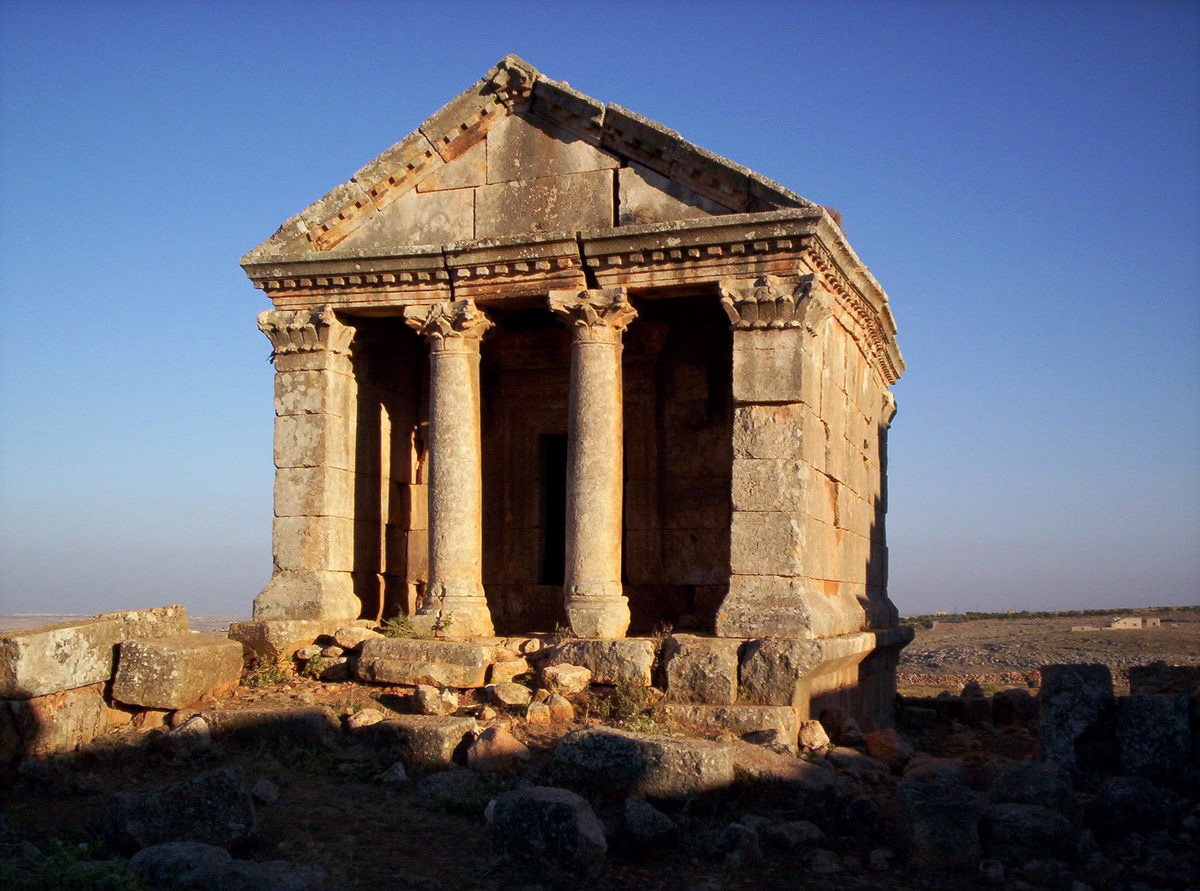
Byzantine temple at Ruweiha near Idlib

Idlib, along with the rest of Syria, was conquered by the Armenian king Tigranes the Great and incorporated in the Armenian Empire, only to be later conquered by the Roman Pompey the Great around 64 BCE. The city was never of much significance, belonging to the province of Roman Syria under the Roman Empire and later to the Eastern Roman province of Syria Secunda before being conquered by the Arabs around the middle of the seventh century. Not much remains from the city's Roman and Byzantine times, except in its museum. North of the city are the Dead Cities, a collection of important archaeological sites from the Byzantine era.

=== Ottoman era ===
During early Ottoman rule in Syria, beginning in 1516, Idlib was a small timar (fief). The village of Idlib was founded by Fadil Ahmed Pasha, the son of Grand Vizier Köprülü Mehmed Pasha (r. 1656–1661) who appointed him governor of Damascus Eyalet. In later years, it developed as a town with markets, bathhouses and caravanserais, including Khan Abi Ali and Khan al-Ruz.

From the Köprülü period, Idlib was a center of olive production. which in turn gave way to a prosperous olive-based soap industry. Although the major markets for Idlib's soap were at Aleppo, Antioch, and Hama, the product was exported as far as the Ottoman capital of Istanbul. Idlib was also a major producer of cotton fabrics. Western traveler Josias Leslie Porter noted that Idlib was "encompassed in olive groves, rare in this bleak region", and remarked that its olive groves were larger than those of Damascus, Beirut, or Gaza. In the mid-19th century, the town had an estimated population of 8,000, including 500 Christians. In the late 19th century, Idlib was "flourishing" and still contained several Christian families, according to German orientalist Albert Socin.

=== Syrian civil war and HTS takeover ===
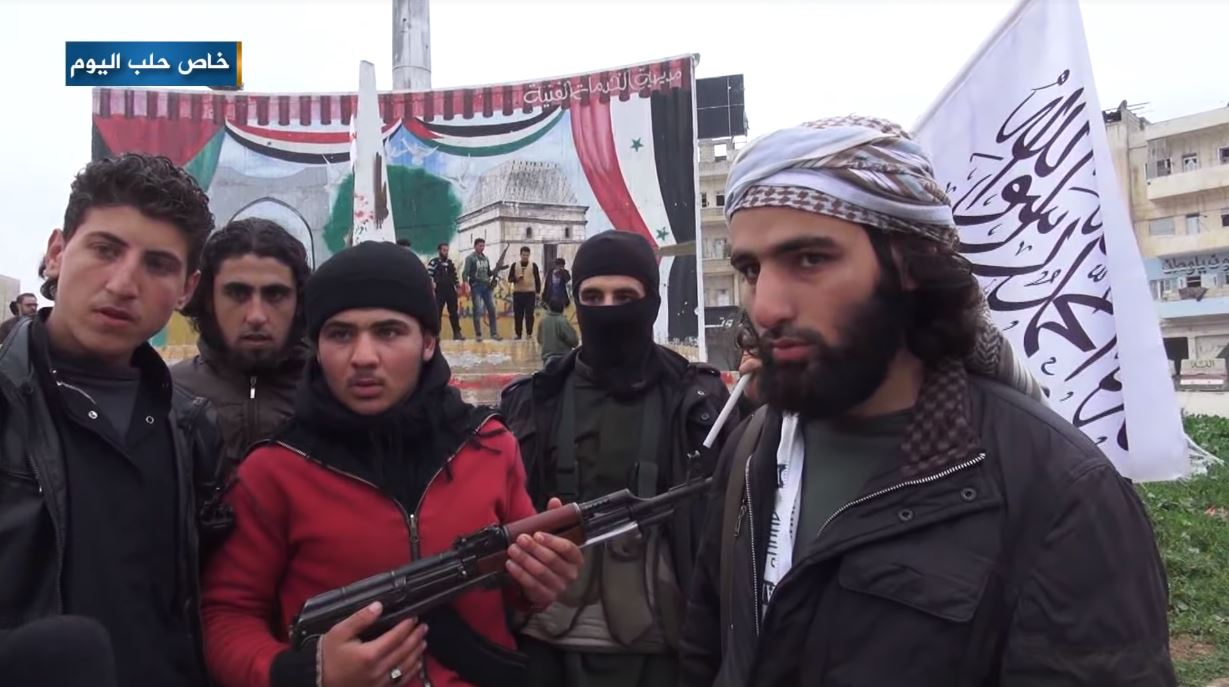
Syrian rebels deface a Ba'athist mural at the Mihrab roundabout in Idlib, after the city's capture by rebel forces in 2015

During the uprising since 2011, Idlib was the focus of protests and fighting in the early phase of the Syrian war. As the uprising descended into armed conflict, Idlib became the focus of a rebel campaign, which temporarily captured the city and the governorate before a government offensive in April 2012. After this, government forces retook the city and the rebel-controlled province after a month of fighting before the attempted enforcement of the ceasefire proposed by Kofi Annan. After the 2015 Idlib offensive in March, the rebel alliance Army of Conquest, led by the al-Nusra Front and Ahrar al-Sham, succeeded in the Second Battle of Idlib and captured the city, as well as besieging the Shi'a-majority towns of Al-Fu'ah and Kafriya to the north of Idlib city. In April 2015, the interim seat of the Syrian opposition's Syrian Interim Government was proposed to be Idlib, in Idlib Governorate. On 23 July 2017, Tahrir al-Sham, the successor to the al-Nusra Front, expelled the remaining forces of Ahrar al-Sham from Idlib, capturing the entire city and bringing it under the control of the Syrian Salvation Government.

On 17 September 2018, Russian President Vladimir Putin and Turkish President Tayyip Erdoğan announced an agreement to establish a demilitarized buffer zone in Syria's Idlib province, intended to separate Syrian government forces from rebel factions. Under the agreement, Turkish and Russian troops would patrol the zone to ensure compliance. Putin stated that all heavy weaponry would be removed from the area and that radical rebel groups, such as the Nusra Front, must withdraw. The buffer zone was set to be operational by October 15, 2018.

== Climate ==
Köppen climate classification system classifies its climate as hot-summer Mediterranean (Csa). Summers are hot and rainless, while winters are rainy and cool.

The all-time record high temperature was 44 °C (111 °F) on June 16, 2012.

Climate data for Idlib, elevation 451 m (1,480 ft)
Month	Jan	Feb	Mar	Apr	May	Jun	Jul	Aug	Sep	Oct	Nov	Dec	Year
Mean daily maximum °C (°F)	10.0 (50.0)	12.1 (53.8)	16.7 (62.1)	21.8 (71.2)	27.2 (81.0)	31.0 (87.8)	32.5 (90.5)	33.5 (92.3)	31.1 (88.0)	26.2 (79.2)	18.8 (65.8)	12.1 (53.8)	22.8 (73.0)
Daily mean °C (°F)	6.5 (43.7)	7.9 (46.2)	11.3 (52.3)	16.2 (61.2)	20.8 (69.4)	25.0 (77.0)	26.7 (80.1)	27.5 (81.5)	25.1 (77.2)	20.5 (68.9)	13.8 (56.8)	8.3 (46.9)	17.5 (63.4)
Mean daily minimum °C (°F)	2.9 (37.2)	3.5 (38.3)	6.6 (43.9)	10.6 (51.1)	14.5 (58.1)	19.0 (66.2)	21.0 (69.8)	21.5 (70.7)	19.2 (66.6)	14.8 (58.6)	8.6 (47.5)	4.5 (40.1)	12.2 (54.0)
Average precipitation mm (inches)	100 (3.9)	92 (3.6)	59 (2.3)	43 (1.7)	16 (0.6)	4 (0.2)	0 (0)	1 (0.0)	5 (0.2)	23 (0.9)	39 (1.5)	97 (3.8)	479 (18.7)
Source: FAO

== Demographics ==
In the 2004 census by the Central Bureau of Statistics of Syria, Idlib had a population of 98,791 and in 2010 the population was around 165,000. The inhabitants are mostly Sunni Muslim, although there was previously a significant Christian minority, but by 2022 there was only a single elderly Christian man left in the city. Idlib is divided into six main districts: Ashrafiyah (the most populous), Hittin, Hejaz, Downtown, Hurriyah, and al-Qusour.

== Economy ==
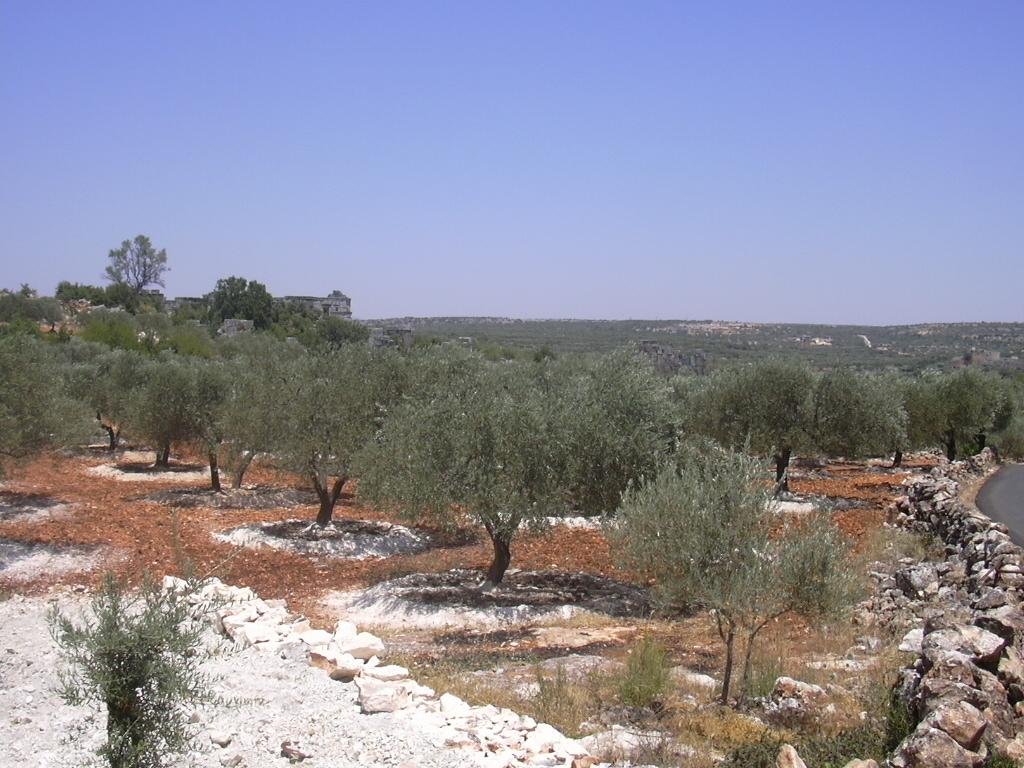
Olive orchards at the outskirts of the city. Idlib is a major production center for olives.

Idlib is a major production center for olives, cotton, wheat and fruits, particularly cherries. Other principal crops include almonds, sesame seeds, figs, grapes and tomatoes. In 1995 there were roughly 300 hectares planted with various citrus crop. Olive oil pressing and textiles are some of the city's local industries. The nearby city of Aleppo has an important economic presence in Idlib.

Idlib is a major agricultural center in Syria. It is also historically significant, containing many "dead cities" and tells.

Because of the rapidly declining value of the Syrian pound, the Turkish lira became widespread in Idlib and was adopted as legal tender in the city on 15 June 2020. This was reversed in 2025.

== Culture ==
The Idlib Regional Museum in the city contains over 17,000 of the Ebla tablets and serves as Idlib's main tourist attraction, excluding the nearby ancient site of Ebla itself. Under the Technical and Financial Cooperation Agreement between the governments of Italy and Syria, the museum was to undergo a restoration and renovation project starting in 2010.

== Sports ==
Omaya SC, founded in 1972, is the most popular football team in the city. The club played in the Syrian Premier League for the 2011-2012 season. Idlib Municipal Stadium is the main football venue in the city.

Refugee and parathlete Dima Aktaa is from the city.

== Sources ==
- Baedeker, Karl (1912), Palestine and Syria, with routes through Mesopotamia and Babylonia and the island of Cyprus: handbook for travellers, K. Baedeker
- Bakhit, Muhammad Adnan (2010). "Abdul-Karim Rafeq, Friend and Colleague". In Sluglett, Peter; Weber, Stefan (eds.). Syria and Bilad al-Sham under Ottoman Rule: Essays in Honour of Abdul-Karim Rafeq. Leiden and Boston: Brill. pp. 59–64. ISBN 978-90-04-18193-9.
- Casule, F. (2008), Art and History Syria, Casa Editrice Bonechi, ISBN 978-8847601192
- Angelo, Ferrari (2009), Proceedings 4th International Congress on "Science and Technology for the Safeguard of Cultural Heritage in the Mediterranean Basin", vol. 1, Angelo Ferrari-CNR, Institute of Chemical Methodologies, ISBN 978-8896680315
- Food and Agriculture Organization of the United Nations (1996). Citrus Pest Problems and Their Control in the Near East. Food & Agriculture Org. ISBN 9251033013.
- Inalcik, Halil (1997), An Economic and Social History of the Ottoman Empire, Cambridge University Press, ISBN 0521574552
- Porter, Josias Leslie (1858). A Handbook for Travellers in Syria and Palestine. Vol. 1. Murray.
