= Joshua Landis =

American academic (born 1957)

Joshua M. Landis (born May 14, 1957) is an American academic who specializes in the Middle East and is an expert on Syria. He is the head of the Center for Middle East Studies at the University of Oklahoma, and since 2004, he has published the blog Syria Comment.

== Background ==
VOA report about Landis from 2015

Landis was born on May 14, 1957, in Manhattan, New York City, New York. When he was one year old, his family moved to Saudi Arabia, where his father was sent by Citibank to open the first branch of an American bank in the country. After staying in Saudi Arabia for three years, Landis' family moved to Beirut, Lebanon, due to his father being transferred there to work as Citibank's vice-president for the Middle East. When Landis was ten years old, his family moved back to the United States.

Landis earned a BA from Swarthmore College, majoring in European History and French Literature. He spent his college sophomore year in France. After graduating, Landis then returned to Beirut in the midst of the Lebanese Civil War to teach at the International College, Beirut. According to Landis, his experience of living in Beirut during the civil war shaped his interpretation of the Syrian Civil War later on. In 1981, Landis went to Damascus University on a Fulbright Grant. During the following year, whilst Landis was still living in Damascus, the Hama uprising of 1982 took place. Landis visited Hama a week after the uprising.

Landis went on to earn an MA from Harvard University, and then a PhD from Princeton University. Fluent in Arabic and French, he has studied Turkish, Italian, and Ottoman Turkish. He has received three Fulbright grants and a Social Science Research Council award.

== Academia ==
He taught at Sarah Lawrence College, Wake Forest University, and Princeton University before moving to the University of Oklahoma. Since May 2004, Landis has published the Syrian Comment blog, which focuses on Syrian politics, history, and religion. Landis regularly travels to Washington, D.C., to consult with government agencies.

Landis is a frequent analyst on TV and radio, such as PBS News Hour, Charlie Rose Show, CNN and Fox News. He comments frequently for NPR and BBC Radio. He has spoken at the Brookings Institution, USIP, Middle East Institute, and Council on Foreign Relations.

== Personal life ==
Landis is married to Manar Kashour, who comes from an Alawite family in Syria.
