= Mohammed al-Awwad =

Syrian Army general (1985–2012)

Mohammed Abdulhamid al-Awwad
- محمد عبد الحميد العواد
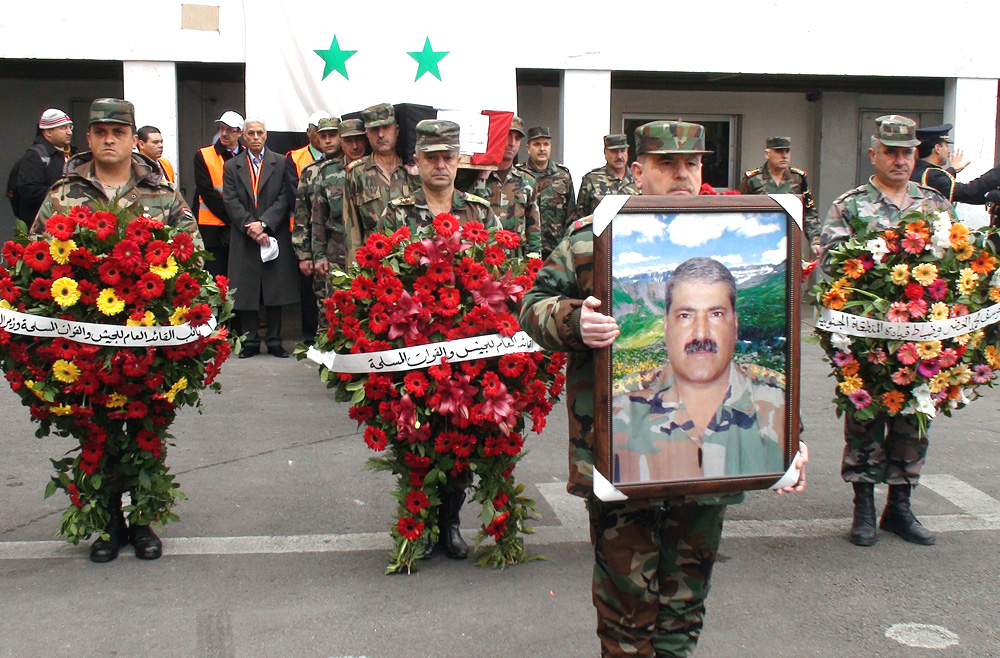
- Funeral of Mohammed al-Awwad
- Born: 1958; Al-Nashabiyah, Syria
- Died: 16 January 2012 (aged 53–54); Ghouta, Syria
- Military career
- Allegiance: Syria
- Branch: Syrian Army
- Rank: Brigadier General
- Conflicts: Syrian Civil War; Rif Dimashq clashes (November 2011–March 2012)

Mohammed Abdul-Hamid al-Awwad (Arabic: محمد عبد الحميد العواد) was a Syrian brigadier general who was assassinated in Damascus during the Syrian civil war. The official Syrian government news agency disclosed that he was killed by armed men, who also wounded his driver in the attack.

== Assassination ==
Al-Awwad's car was ambushed when he was heading to the unit he commanded in the eastern Ghouta region of Rif Dimashq. The driver testified that a taxi had passed their car, while four gunmen shot al-Awwad in the head. He was from the Damascus Countryside.
