= Abu Hashim al-Ibrahim =

Iraqi Leader

- Born: Abu Hashim Muhammad bin Abdul Rahman al-Ibrahim; Baghdad, Iraq
- Education: Studied Islamic law in Baghdad
- Military career
- Allegiance: Jama'at Ansar al-Islam
- Service years: 2006–2014
- Rank: Leader
- Unit: Jama'at Ansar al-Islam
- Commands: Jama'at Ansar al-Islam
- Known for: Leader of Jama'at Ansar al-Islam (2011–2014)
- Conflicts: Iraqi insurgency,

Abu Hashim Muhammad bin Abdul Rahman al-Ibrahim was the third leader of Jama'at Ansar al-Islam, a Salafi Jihadi group operating in Iraq, until 2014.

== History ==
A native of Baghdad, he's a former Shia Muslim who became a Sunni, and studied Islamic law at the hands of many scholars in Baghdad, and hadith with Sabhi al-Samarra'i.

== Ansar al-Islam ==
He joined Jama'at Ansar al-Islam in 2006 through Abd al-Raheem Abu Anwar, a Salafi preacher of Baghdad and close to Abu Wa'el Sa'adun al-Qadi. Abu Wa'el vouched for him.

He was working in the Shari'i investigations department affiliated with the group's Shari'a Committee and then became the right hand to Abu al-Abbas al-Kurdi, leader of the Shari'a Committee. Abu Hashim took over the Shari'i Committee in the time of Abu al-Abbas' sojourn. Later he became one of the members of the Majlis Shura, the council managing the group.

He was subject to more than one assassination attempt at the hands of the Islamic State of Iraq.

At some point he moved from Baghdad to Tikrit, but he was advised to depart Tikrit because foreigners stood out. He was living in Mosul with his family in 2008.

== Leadership ==
He was elected to the leadership of Jama'at Ansar al-Islam by consensus of the Majlis Shura on 15 December 2011. He got arrested in early 2014 by Iraqi forces.
