= Umm al-Dawali =

Umm al-Dawali أم الدوالي
- Village
- Location in Syria
- Coordinates: 34°39′48″N 36°25′44″E
- Country: Syria
- Governorate: Homs
- District: Talkalakh
- Subdistrict: Hadidah

Population (2004)
  - Total: 1,588
- Time zone: UTC+2 (EET)
  - Summer (DST): +3

Umm al-Dawali (Arabic: أم الدوالي) is a village in northern Syria located northwest of Homs in the Homs Governorate. According to the Syria Central Bureau of Statistics, Umm al-Dawali had a population of 1,558 in the 2004 census. Its inhabitants are predominantly Alawites.

== Bibliography ==
- Robinson, E.; Smith, E. (1841). Biblical Researches in Palestine, Mount Sinai and Arabia Petraea: A Journal of Travels in the year 1838. Vol. 3. Boston: Crocker & Brewster.
