= Kafriya =

Kafriya كفريا
- Village
- Location within Syria
- Coordinates: 35°59′23″N 36°40′39″E
- Country: Syria
- Governorate: Idlib
- District: Idlib
- Subdistrict: Ma'arrat Misrin

Population (2004 census)
  - Total: 4,404
- Time zone: UTC+2 (EET)
  - Summer (DST): UTC+3 (EEST)

Kafriya (Arabic: كفريا, also spelled Kifarya or Kefraya) is a village in northern Syria, administratively part of the Idlib Governorate, located northwest of Idlib. Nearby localities include Maarrat Misrin to the north, Zardana to the northeast, Taftanaz to the east and al-Fu'ah and Binnish to the immediate south. According to the Syria Central Bureau of Statistics, Kafriya had a population of 4,404 in the 2004 census. Like nearby al-Fu'ah, Kafriya's inhabitants were predominantly Shia Muslims, while the surrounding areas are predominantly Sunni Muslim.

== Syrian Civil War ==
During the Syrian Civil War the village was placed under siege by rebels, and on 11 January 2016 the International Committee of the Red Cross and the World Food Programme organised an aid convoy to deliver food, medicine and other aid to the village and the nearby town Al-Fu'ah.

On 19 July 2018, residents of Kafriya and al-Fu'ah and government fighters stationed in the two besieged towns were evacuated by buses to government-controlled Aleppo under an agreement between Iran, the Syrian government, and Hayat Tahrir al-Sham, with Turkey as a mediator. Following the evacuation, the emptied towns were declared a military zone by HTS.

During the evacuation process, a terrorist attack on the convoy of buses awaiting admission into government-held territories occurred, after which 126 people, including 68 children were killed.

As of 6 February 2025, the original residents remain displaced, with the village currently being inhabited by 2,892 IDPs (mostly from Idlib and Hama Governorates).
