= Rami Abdulrahman =

Syrian human rights activist based in the United Kingdom

- رامي عبد الرحمن
- Born: Osama Ali Suleiman; 1971 (age 54–55); Baniyas, Syria
- Citizenship: Syrian, British
- Occupation: Human rights activist
- Years active: 2000–present
- Organization: Syrian Observatory for Human Rights
- Known for: Founding the Syrian Observatory for Human Rights
- Notable work: Documentation of human rights violations in Syria
- Awards: Politiken Freedom Prize (2016); Henri Nannen Prize for Freedom of the Press (2020)

Osama Ali Suleiman, known as Rami Abdulrahman (Arabic: رامي عبد الرحمن; born 1971 in Baniyas), is a Syrian human rights activist and founder of the Syrian Observatory for Human Rights, established in 2006. Living in the United Kingdom since 2000, he holds British citizenship. The Observatory became a key source for documenting human rights violations in Syria. Abdulrahman has received several awards, including the Henri Nannen Prize for Freedom of the Press in 2020, and has denied accusations challenging the credibility of the Observatory’s reports.

== Life ==
Rami Abdulrahman was born in the coastal city of Baniyas and followed a leftist political path similar to that of his father. He was imprisoned several times because of his political activism during the rule of Hafez al-Assad. He later emigrated to the United Kingdom in 2000 and settled in Coventry. Among his earliest activities in exile was organizing demonstrations in front of the Syrian embassy in London in 2003, before founding the Syrian Observatory for Human Rights in May 2006.

Since the outbreak of the Syrian revolution, the Observatory has worked to document violations against civilians by all parties to the conflict. Abdulrahman received death threats as a result of this work, most notably from ISIS. He has also been accused by various sources in the Middle East of receiving foreign funding, but he stated that the organization is funded by European institutions.

Following the Fall of the Assad regime, he worked on documenting crimes against minorities in Syria’s coastal region. He was accused of belonging to the Alawite sect, but he stated that he belongs to the Sunni sect.

== Awards ==
Rami Abdulrahman was listed among the world’s most influential figures by Foreign Policy magazine in 2014. He also received the Politiken Freedom Prize in 2016, and in 2020 the German magazine Stern awarded him the Henri Nannen Prize for Freedom of the Press.
