= Syrian Arab Red Crescent =

Humanitarian aid organization

- Flag of the Red Crescent
- Abbreviation: SARC
- Formation: 1942
- Type: Non Profit Organization
- Legal status: Foundation
- Purpose: Humanitarian
- Headquarters: Damascus
- Region served: Syria
- Director: Mohammad Hazem Mohammad Sharif
- Website: www.sarc.sy

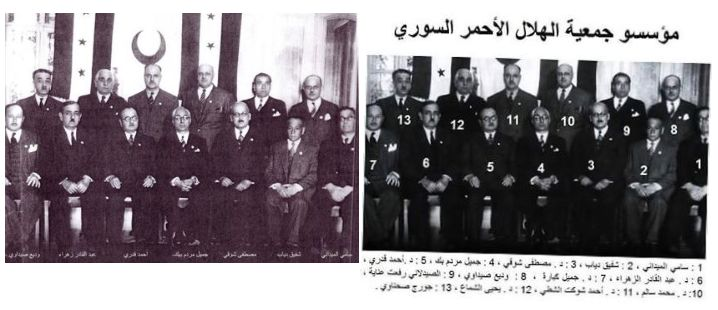

The Syrian Arab Red Crescent (SARC) (Arabic: الهلال الأحمر العربي السوري Al-Hilal al-Aḥmar al-Arabi al-Souri) is a Syrian humanitarian aid organization. It is affiliated with the International Federation of Red Cross and Red Crescent Societies.

== History ==
The society was founded in Damascus, Syria in 1942, and admitted to the International Committee of the Red Cross (ICRC) in 1946. Some of founders included were Abdul-Kader Zahra, Jamil Kabara, Sami Al-Meedani, Shafiq Diyab, Mustafa Shawky, Ahmed Kadary, Wade Saydawy, Mounib Rifai, and others. The society is part of the International Federation and has been recognized by the ICRC. The SARC has 14 branches all over Syria and 75 sub-branches. Volunteer based, the SARC has around 11,000 trained volunteers that work in the areas of first aid, first aid training, disaster response and relief, psycho-social support, and health in general. SARC also partners with local charity organizations and works with the relevant components of the Syrian community, with UN agencies and NGOs.

=== Syrian civil war ===
The organization is working in the Syrian civil war and is engaged in evacuation of people from war torn region to other places. It is shifting people and militants who surrender and relocating them to other places. When Darayya surrendered to government forces, the militants were relocated by the Red Crescent.

SARC volunteers and hospitals have been the targets of numerous attacks since the beginning of the Syrian civil war. In 2016 a UN aid convoy composed mostly of SARC workers driving near Urum al-Kubra was bombed, killing at least 12 SARC drivers and destroying aid supplies in a warehouse. According to the ICRC 20 civilians were also killed in the attack. UN Secretary General Ban Ki-moon condemned the attack and temporarily suspended UN aid convoys after the attack. A UN investigation carried out by the Independent International Commission of Inquiry on the Syrian Arab Republic found that the Syrian government deliberately carried out the attack on the aid convoy which they allege amounts to a potential war crime.

In December 2016, Syrian Prime Minister Imad Khamis appointed Khaled Hboubati as SARC director to replace Abdul Rahman al-Attar. Al-Attar had previously served as director for more than 25 years, but received official orders to resign. According to Enab Baladi, SARC was directly linked to the Assad regime after Hboubati's appointment. Since 2011, there were allegations that SARC had lost independence after the Syrian government froze SARC's elections indefinitely and eliminated independent staff members. The Syrian Ministry of Foreign Affairs required all relief agencies to sign agreements with SARC as the official government partner to receive foreign aid.

=== Syrian transitional government ===
After the fall of the Assad regime in 2024, the Syrian transitional government appointed Mohammad Hazem Mohammad Sharif Baqlah to replace Khaled Hboubati as director.

== See also ==
- International Committee of the Red Cross
- International Red Cross and Red Crescent Movement
