= Al-Fu'ah =

Al-Fu'ah الْفُوعَة
- Village
- Location within Syria
- Coordinates: 35°58′54″N 36°42′6″E
- Country: Syria
- Governorate: Idlib
- District: Idlib
- Subdistrict: Binnish

Population (2004)
  - Total: 10,264
- Time zone: UTC+2 (EET)
  - Summer (DST): UTC+3 (EEST)

Al-Fu'ah (Arabic: الْفُوعَة, romanized: al-Fūʿah, also spelled al-Fouaa and al-Fo'ua) is a town in northern Syria, administratively part of the Idlib Governorate, located northeast of Idlib. Nearby localities include Kafriya to the west, Maarrat Misrin to the northwest, Zardana to the north, Taftanaz to the northeast, Ta'um to the east and Binnish and Sarmin to the south. The plain surrounding al-Fu'ah is well known for growing olives and figs.

According to the Syria Central Bureau of Statistics, the town had a population of 10,264 in the 2004 census. The inhabitants were predominantly Shia Muslims.

== History ==
=== Medieval period ===
During the Crusades, the town was a barrier fortress of the Principality of Antioch. The town was later captured by Fakhr al-Mulk Radwan in 1104. Alsunqur al-Bursuqi of Mosul occupied al-Fu'ah, along with Sarmin, in 1126.

Al-Fu'ah was visited by Syrian geographer Yaqut al-Hamawi in the early 13th century, during Ayyubid rule. He noted that it was a "large village in the neighborhood of Halab. From it the convent called Dair Fu'ah takes its name." He also mentioned that the people in the town and the surrounding area including Aleppo, followed Twelver Shi'ism or as he describes it "Imami".

In the late 13th century, the town was mentioned by Syrian geographer Abu'l-Fida, who described the town as a celebrated place in the plain of Aleppo. He noted that, "on this plain are grown quantities of olive, fig and other trees."

=== Syrian Civil War ===
While most towns in the Idlib Governorate came under the control of anti-government rebels during the Syrian Civil War, al-Fu'ah and the nearby town of Kafriya constituted an isolated pro-government enclave. In July 2012 a rebel unit kidnapped three Shia Muslim civilians from the town for the stated purpose of exchanging them for anti-aircraft weaponry. In response, some of al-Fu'ah's residents kidnapped 32 Sunni Muslims from nearby Taftanaz, Saraqib and Binnish. After two weeks of negotiations, all captives were safely released.

On 18 September 2015, al-Fu'ah was badly damaged, following a suicide bombing with an armoured vehicle full of explosives from Uzbek-led militant group Imam Bukhari Jamaat, an affiliate of al-Qaeda.

The town was placed under siege by rebels, and on 11 January 2016, the International Committee of the Red Cross and the World Food Programme organised an aid convoy to deliver food, medicine and other aid to the town and nearby village Kafriya.

On 19 July 2018, residents of Fuah and Kafriya and pro-government fighters stationed in the two besieged towns were evacuated by buses to government-controlled Aleppo under an agreement between Iran, the Syrian Government, and Hayat Tahrir al-Sham, with Turkey as a mediator. Syrian Government released 1,500 HTS prisoners in exchange for the safe evacuation of these towns. Following the evacuation, the emptied towns were temporarily declared a military zone by HTS.

== Bibliography ==
- Azoo, Rizkallah F. (1916). Gems of Arabic literature. Devidas Chhaganlal. "town and Sarmain and Ma'arat-Masrln are."
- Setton, Kenneth M.; Baldwin, Marshall W., eds. (2006). A History of the Crusades, Volume I: The First Hundred Years. Univ of Wisconsin Press. ISBN 9780299048341.
- Houtsma, M. Thomas (1987). E.J. Brill's First Encyclopaedia of Islam, 1913-1936. BRILL. ISBN 9004082654.
- le Strange, Guy (1890). Palestine Under the Moslems: A Description of Syria and the Holy Land from A.D. 650 to 1500. Committee of the Palestine Exploration Fund.
