= Syrian Observatory for Human Rights =

Information office documenting human rights abuses in the Syrian Civil War

Syrian Observatory for Human Rights (SOHR)
- Native name: المرصد السوري لحقوق الإنسان
- Website type: News reporting
- Available in: 2 languages
- List of languages: Arabic; English
- Founded: May 2006
- Headquarters: Coventry, United Kingdom
- Founder: Rami Abdulrahman
- Website: syriahr.com

The Syrian Observatory for Human Rights (also known as SOHR; Arabic: المرصد السوري لحقوق الإنسان), founded in May 2006, is a United Kingdom-based information office whose stated aim is to document human rights abuses in Syria; since 2011 it has focused on the Syrian civil war. It has been frequently quoted by major news outlets since the beginning of the war about daily numbers of deaths from all sides in the conflict and particularly civilians killed in airstrikes in Syria. The SOHR has been described as being anti-Assad and supporting the Syrian opposition, (Note: Attributed to multiple sources:) but has reported on war crimes committed by all sides of the conflict.

== History and operations ==
The Syrian Observatory for Human Rights is run by Rami Abdulrahman, from his home in Coventry. Abdulrahman is a Syrian Sunni who owns a clothing shop. Born Osama Suleiman, he adopted a pseudonym during his years of activism in Syria and has used it publicly ever since. After being imprisoned three times in Syria, Abdulrahman fled to the United Kingdom fearing a fourth jail term and has not returned.

In a December 2011 interview with Reuters, Abdulrahman claimed the observatory has a network of more than 200 people and that six of his sources had been killed. In 2012, Süddeutsche Zeitung described the organisation as a one-man-operation with Abdulrahman its only permanent member. In April 2013, The New York Times described him as being on the phone all day everyday with contacts in Syria, relying on four individuals inside the country who collate information from more than 230 activists, while cross-checking all information with sources himself.

== Accuracy and independence ==
Neil Sammonds, a British researcher for the London-based Amnesty International, said, "Generally, the information on the killings of civilians is very good, definitely one of the best, including the details on the conditions in which people were supposedly killed."

The organisation says on its website that "The Syrian Observatory for Human Rights is not associated or linked to any political body."

SOHR has been described as being "pro-opposition" or anti-Assad and has been criticised for refusing to share its data or methodology. It has been also criticised for selective reporting, covering only violent acts of the government forces against the opposition for the first two years of its existence and reporting anti-government fighter deaths as civilians deaths.

Classified U.S. diplomatic cables, provided by the anti-secrecy Web site WikiLeaks, showed that the U.S. State Department has funneled $6 million to Barada TV, an anti-Assad satellite TV channel operated by people affiliated with SOHR, between 2006 and 2011 to operate the satellite channel and finance activities inside Syria, The Washington Post reported in 2011. In 2013, The New York Times reported that Rami Abdulrahman had received small subsidies from the European Union and one European country. Medialens said that journalist Ian Sinclair confirmed "in communication with the Foreign Office" that "the UK funded a project worth £194,769.60 to provide the Syrian Observatory for Human Rights with communications equipment and cameras."

== See also ==
- Casualty recording
- Syrian Network for Human Rights
- Violations Documentation Center in Syria
