= Kabani, Syria =

Kabani كبانة
- Town
- Location in Syria
- Coordinates: 35°43′6″N 36°14′1″E
- Country: Syria
- Governorate: Latakia
- District: al-Haffah
- Subdistrict: Kinsabba

Population (2004)
  - Total: 902
- Time zone: UTC+3 (EET)
  - Summer (DST): UTC+2 (EEST)
- City Qrya Pcode: C3751

Kabani or Kabanah (Arabic: كبانة) is a Syrian town in the Al-Haffah District in Latakia Governorate. According to the Syria Central Bureau of Statistics (CBS), Kabani had a population of 902 in the 2004 census.

== During the Syrian Civil War ==
Responding to the regime's military crackdown on the ongoing protest, Kabani residents formed the village self-defense group from the Summer to the fall of 2011. Armed with hunting rifles and small rifles, the group was tasked to provide security during the demonstrations. In December 2011, a villager named Abu Ahmed founded the first opposition group, Katiba Umm Al Thuwar.

From mid-2011 to 2012, Kabani became a safe haven for regime defectors and anti-Assad figures as well as civilians who fled from Assad soldiers' attacks. Regime forces raided Kabani in late March 2012, looting the civilians' houses and killing every animal. During the raid, the self-defense group and villagers fled to the forest. After the raid, the village became the hub of rebel groups in Latakia Province.

In early 2015, Kabani was under the control of the Free Syrian Army's 1st Coastal Division. It witnessed over a dozen consecutive military attacks (2015–16 Latakia offensive and 2016 Latakia offensive) to control it by the Syrian Arab Army, since it is one of the highest points in Jabal al-Akrad, that overlooks the Al-Ghab Plains, and from where the rebels still had the ability to shell government strongholds like Qardaha. Despite numerous attempts by the Syrian army to take the city, the rebels succeeded in countering every Syrian army attack, until the latest offensive from 31 May 2020.

In January 2015, at the very latest Kabani became a jihadist stronghold after the fall of Salma to the Syrian Army. From 2017 on, the town was under the control of the Salafi jihadist groups Hay'at Tahrir al-Sham and the Turkistan Islamic Party. On May 19, 2019, these groups alleged that the Syrian government had released chlorine gas on their fighting forces in the town. According to them, four militants were wounded and taken to a hospital in the nearby rebel stronghold of Jisr al-Shughur, where they were treated.

In February 2021, the rebels were subjected to air strikes that were not reported in western media.

== Economy ==
Before the civil war, agriculture was the primary source of income for the villagers. The residents harvested apples, peaches, and cherries.
