= 2016 Latakia offensive =

Military operation of the Syrian civil war

- Part of the Syrian Civil War and the Russian military intervention in the Syrian Civil War
Date	27 June – 12 August 2016 (1 month, 2 weeks and 2 days)
Location	Latakia Governorate, Syria
Status	Syrian government victory: Rebels initially capture Kinsabba and 11 villages; The Army recaptures all lost territory, except 1 village

Belligerents
(Syria) Syrian Arab Republic; Syrian Armed Forces; Syrian Social Nationalist Party; Hezbollah (Syria) Saraya al-Areen (Iran) (Syria) Liwa al-Mukhtar al-Thiqfi Russia (air strikes)	Army of Conquest; al-Nusra Front (Jabhat Fateh al-Sham since mid-2016); Ahrar al-Sham; Turkistan Islamic Party in Syria; Sham Legion; Ajnad al-Sham; (Syrian opposition) Free Syrian Army; Movement of Salah al-Din the Kurd; Imam Bukhari Jamaat; Ajnad al-Kavkaz; Junud al-Makhdi

Commanders and leaders
Lt. Gen. Ali Abdullah Ayyoub (Chief of Staff of the Army); Gen. Mohammad Jaber (Desert Hawks Brigade chief commander) (Syria) Abu al-Jarrah (Al-Daher Hawks Brigade commander) (Iran) (Syria) Badi’ Muhammad Hasawi (Latakia commander of Liwa al-Mukhtar al-Thiqfi)	Abdel Aziz al-Ali † (Ajnad al-Sham top commander); Hazem Shardoub † (Sham Legion top commander); Abd Al-Salam Omar Kiliyeh † (Sham Legion commander); Samer Fawwaz Sadeq † (Sham Legion commander); Wafi Mohammad Hashem † (Sham Legion commander); Unknown al-Nusra field commander †; Unknown Ajnad al Kavkaz commander †; Unknown 1st Coastal Brigade commander †; Fadi Bitar † (3rd Coastal Brigade commander); Riyad Qarrah Bijeq (DOW) (2nd Coastal Division commander); Unknown al-Adiyat brigade commander †

Units involved
Syrian Army; Republican Guard; 103rd Brigade; Syrian Marines; Quwat al-Ghadab volunteers; Desert Hawks Brigade; Special Forces; 144th Regiment; National Defence Forces; Military Intelligence Directorate; Military Security Shield Forces; Syrian Arab Air Force; Russian Armed Forces; Russian Air Force	Al-Nusra Front / Jabhat Fateh al-Sham; Jaish al-Muhajireen wal-Ansar; Katibat al-Tawhid wal-Jihad; (Syrian opposition) Free Syrian Army; 1st Coastal Division; 1st Coastal Brigade; 3rd Coastal Brigade; 2nd Coastal Division; Mount Turkmen Brigade; Sham Legion; Jaysh al-Nukhba; Jaysh al-Nasr; al-Adiyat brigade; Jaysh al-Izza

Casualties and losses
40+ killed, several captured	107+ killed

The 2016 Latakia offensive, code-named Battle of Yarmouk, refers to a rebel operation launched in the northern Latakia Governorate in late June 2016. The aim of the offensive was to recapture the territory lost during the Army's offensive earlier in the year.

== The offensive ==
=== Rebel capture of Kinsabba ===
Between 27 and 30 June, the al-Nusra-led Army of Conquest, supported by FSA groups, launched the offensive on the Turkmen and Kurd Mountains, capturing several villages before they withdrew under Russian airstrikes. 33 rebels and 15 soldiers were killed in the fighting. Still, a second rebel assault one day later managed to capture Kinsabba, as well as a dozen nearby villages and hills. In reaction, the Russian Air Force conducted more than 100 airstrikes over Kinsabba and several other villages.

On 2 July, the rebels captured the Jabal Qal’at mountaintop in the Turkmen mountains. The next day, the rebels captured the strategically significant village of Saraf and its surrounding hills, before it was recaptured by the Syrian Marines, backed by the NDF and the SSNP, later that night.

On 4 July, Republic Guard reinforcements arrived in Salma for an anticipated government offensive. By 5 July, the Syrian Army had surrounded Kinsabba on two sides and prepared to launch its offensive to retake the town. The Army as well as the Republican Guard had already begun their artillery bombardment of the site. Meanwhile, the Army of Conquest was reported to have sent reinforcements to the southern Aleppo countryside instead of Kinsabba. Heavy clashes continued around Turkmen Mountain and the village of Bashura, with Islamist rebels attacking government positions amid aerial and artillery bombardment.

On 5 July, Lt. Gen. Ali Abdullah Ayyoub personally inspected the troops in northern Latakia that were preparing the awaited government offensive. At midnight, heavy clashes between government forces and Islamist fighters took place around the Turkmen Mountain, while airplanes bombed the village of Kabani. On 6 July, government units reportedly repelled another al-Nusra attack on their positions. Furthermore, the 144th Regiment of the Syrian Army, which is "skilled in guerilla warfare" according to Farsnews, was deployed to northern Latakia.

=== First Army counter-attack ===
On 8 July, the government launched its counter-offensive, as Syrian Marines, Desert Hawks and Special Forces stormed two locations south of Kinsabba, a hilltop and a nearby village (Shillif). Government troops managed to recapture both. During the fighting, the Sham Legion suffered many casualties, among them a local commander. Two days later, government forces launched a new assault towards Kinsabba, attacking the surrounding hills and capturing several positions. However, by the end of the day, the rebels recaptured the positions they had lost.

In the night of 13–14 July, the al-Nusra Front and the Turkistan Islamic Party launched a surprise assault in the area of Kabbani, capturing the Zuwayqat Hills to the village's south. In response, the Russian Air Force intensified their attacks on the advancing rebels, while the government forces regrouped to launch a counter-attack.

On 16 July, government forces had retaken Qalat Tubal, south of Kinsabba, and later in the day took back Kinsabba itself. Overall, the operation to retake Kinsabba lasted 12 hours. Subsequently, all of the surrounding villages and hills were also recaptured by the Army. At dawn on the next day, the rebels launched a counter-attack against Kinsabba, and managed to retake the town. Subsequently, a new Army attack was launched with fighting continuing into 18 July, when the military once again took control of the town and its surrounding hills and villages.

On 19 July, a second rebel counter-attack was launched with an al-Nusra suicide-bomber targeting Army positions at Qal’at Shalaf, forcing government forces to withdraw to Kinsabba. The rebels than, once again, advanced into the town. Subsequently, the rebels again recaptured Kinsabba, marking the fourth time the town changed hands over the previous 72 hours. Meanwhile, as fighting at Kinsabba continued, the Army captured several other villages in the area.

On 20 July, the al-Nusra Front, backed by the Turkistan Islamic Party, and Ahrar al-Sham, captured the village of Shalaf, and forced pro-government forces to retreat from all positions in the Kurd Mountains they had recently recaptured.

=== Interlude ===
On 28 July, the Army of Conquest launched a new offensive in Latakia, aimed at capturing the Zuwayqat Mountains. Their first attack was repelled by government forces, but in course of a second assault later that day, the rebels took the Zuwayqat Mountains. Pro-government fighters were forced to retreat south to avoid being overrun, regrouping for a counter-attack later that day, which reversed all rebel gains made.

=== Second Army counter-attack ===
The next day, the government launched a new offensive aimed at recapturing Kinsabba. During the assault, Syrian Marines, Desert Hawks and NDF units recaptured Shalaf village, while other government units attacked Kabani village as well as other sites in the Kurd Mountains. Despite the new government advances, the Army of Conquest subsequently began to move hundreds of fighters from Latakia to Aleppo, where they were to counter another government offensive. The redeployment reportedly weakened the rebel frontline in Latakia significantly.

On 30 July, government fighters directly attacked Kinsabba from Shalaf, resulting in heavy clashes, though the assault yielded no government gains and the offensive was halted.

=== Third counter-attack and Army recaptures Kinsabba ===
On 4 August, pro-government forces again launched a counter-attack to recapture the lost territory, targeting the Toubal and Shillif hills overlooking Kinsabba. In the morning on the next day, they stormed Kinsabba's outskirts, resulting in heavy fighting with the Islamist defenders, who still held all the nearby hills. Pro-government units attempted to surround the town, which they claimed to have done by 6 August, capturing Shillif hill and imposing fire control over the town. Nevertheless, the government forces had not yet entered the town itself. Government forces also managed to ambush rebels coming as reinforcements to Kinsabba, killing 16–50 of them, then proceeding to capture Toubal hill and Ruwaysat Shams Mountain. This allowed pro-government forces to impose fire control over Kinsabba.

After the government had captured the hills around Kinsabba, the rebels retreated from the town. Nevertheless, pro-government forces entered the town only after their force had also advanced toward Kabani. This was to ensure that no rebel surprise counter-attack could overwhelm them like the previous time they had recaptured Kinsabba. A rebel counter-attack still managed to push the army out of the town once again, but the military had taken full control of the town and its surroundings after it received reinforcements. The rebels suffered heavy casualties due to air and artillery strikes and sniper fire from the surrounding hills. In course of the fighting, two commanders of the rebel 1st Coastal Division were also killed. After the taking of Kinsabba, the Army continued its advance and retook almost all of the other villages it had lost during the rebel offensive.

Government advances continued on 9 August, with the Army capturing the mountaintop Jabal Al-Qal’at, only a few kilometers from the Turkish border. Two rebel counter-attack early on 10 and 12 August, were repelled, with the rebels retreating to the Turkish border. In course of the failed counter-attacks, the rebels suffered heavy casualties, including three commanders.

== Aftermath ==
On 12 August, government forces and Hezbollah units launched an offensive aimed at capturing Kabbani from the rebels. As of 16 August, heavy fighting between government and Jabhat Fateh forces continued around Kabbani. A new government offensive against Kabbani was launched in late August, but the assault was again repelled the first day.

On 9 September, a new wide-scale government offensive in northern Latakia and captured 13 villages, as well as several nearby hills, with government forces being on the verge of reaching the Idlib Governorate's provincial border. The government forces also captured several mountaintops around the rebel stronghold of Kabbani 12 September. At the end of September, government forces advanced at Tal Haddadeh hilltop.

In February 2017, the 1st Coastal Division and the Free Idlib Army bombarded the Shalaf Castle on the Kurd Mountain area where Syrian government forces were stationed with BM-21 Grad rockets.

In early April, the rebels launched an assault towards Kinsabba. However, after one hour of fighting, the attack on the Al-Zuwayqat axis was repelled.

== See also ==
- Latakia offensive (2015–2016)
