= Salma, Syria =

Village in northwestern Syria

Salma سَلْمَىٰ
- Village
- Location within Syria
- Coordinates: 35°41′24″N 36°8′12″E
- Country: Syria
- Governorate: Latakia
- District: al-Haffah
- Subdistrict: Slinfah

Population (2004 census)
  - Total: 2,131
- Time zone: UTC+2 (EET)
  - Summer (DST): UTC+3 (EEST)

Salma (Arabic: سَلْمَىٰ, romanized: Salmā) is a village in northwestern Syria, administratively part of the Latakia Governorate, located northeast of Latakia. Nearby localities include Mashqita and Ayn al-Bayda to the west, al-Haffah to the southwest, Aramo and Slinfah 12 km to the south, and Kinsabba to the north. According to the Syria Central Bureau of Statistics, Salma had a population of 2,131 in the 2004 census. Its inhabitants and those of the Jabal al-Akrad area are predominantly Sunni Muslims, although about 60% of the Latakia District's residents are Alawites.

== Geography ==
Salma is the largest settlement in Jabal al-Akrad, a rural mountainous area at the northeasternmost end of the Syrian Coastal Mountain Range. The town sits on a plateau in between two steep ravines. Immediately west of the settlement is a Eocene hill and waterfall, Jabal al-Marij. Salma is situated about 800 meters (2,600 ft) above sea level. It has a dry climate and its plentiful clean water.

== Economy ==
Apple growing is the main agricultural activity in Salma. Apple farmers generally invested their profits in stoneworks in Latakia or in the town's tourism sector. Tourism in the town grew rapidly in the 1980s. One major indicator of the growth of this sector was the 125% increase in homes in Salma between 1981 and 1994 despite a population growth of 17%. Most of the new homes were used for vacation rentals and about half of the houses in Salma are owned by residents of Aleppo or Latakia as summerhomes. As of the late 1990s, Salma nevertheless continued to lack any hotels or restaurants and its lodging capacity was considerably less than the nearby resort village of Slinfah, the major and long-established tourism destination of the mountains east of Latakia. Its main draw compared to Slinfeh is the significantly lower costs for renting and owning and its socially conservative Muslim character which attracts similarly oriented, mainly Sunni Muslim visitors from the region who spurn more the liberal Slinfeh. The influx of Aleppine and Latakian homeowners in Salma has also opened networks of employment to many of the town's residents into those major cities.

== History ==
Salma was one of the first communities to gain public services in Jabal al-Akrad. It was connected to the electric grid in 1950, its roadway connection to the main Aleppo–Latakia highway was paved in 1965, it obtained running water in 1977 and telephone services in 1981. Throughout the 1980s, most of the rest of Jabal al-Akrad's communities gained public services.

=== Syrian civil war ===
On 4 June 2012, 100 Liwa Ahrar al-Sahel fighters attacked Salma at 7 PM and captured it the next day. As of late July 2012 the FSA controlled the town, whose population has mostly left (part to Latakia city and part to Turkey). The FSA said that they were able to hold on to Salma thanks to its mountainous nature and the fact that it is surrounded by Sunni villages. It was on the front line of fighting in Latakia Governorate between rebels and government forces for a lengthy period of time. In November 2013, reporter Jonathan Steele claimed that the town was the Latakia governorate headquarters of both al-Nusra Front and the Islamic State of Iraq and the Levant.

On 9 November 2015, it was reported that for over a month the Syrian Armed Forces had conducted several small military operations inside the Latakia Governorate in order to prepare for a much larger battle that was expected to take place in the rebel stronghold of Salma. By the end of November, the capture of Kafr Dulbeh and Katf al-Ghaddar had brought the Syrian Armed Forces forces to the gates of Salma. On 12 January 2016, the Syrian army with allies recaptured the town of Salma and the nearby village of Tirtyah. Rebels said the town was subjected to intense Russian airstrikes and that most remaining residents had fled towards the Turkish border.

== Bibliography ==
- Balanche, Fabrice (2000). "Les Alaouites, l'espace et le pouvoir dans la région côtière syrienne : une intégration nationale ambiguë" (in French). Tours: Université François Rabelais.
- Balanche, Fabrice (2006). La région alaouite et le pouvoir syrien (in French). Karthala Editions. ISBN 2845868189.
