= Jankil =

Jankil جنكيل Qadisiya
- Village
- Location within Syria
- Coordinates: 35°37′18″N 36°3′11″E
- Country: Syria
- Governorate: Latakia
- District: Al-Haffah
- Subdistrict: Al-Haffah

Population (2004 census)
  - Total: 1,229
- Time zone: UTC+2 (EET)
  - Summer (DST): UTC+3 (EEST)

Jankil (Arabic: جنكيل, also transliterated Jinkil), officially called Qadisiyya, is a village in northwestern Syria, administratively part of the al-Haffah District, located northeast of Latakia. According to the Syria Central Bureau of Statistics, Jankil had a population of 1,229 in the 2004 census. Its inhabitants are Sunni Muslims.

== Syrian Civil War ==
On 7 September 2012, Jankil and the neighboring village Babna were subjected to tank shelling and machine gun fire by government troops.

== Bibliography ==
- Balanche, Fabrice (2000). "Les Alaouites, l'espace et le pouvoir dans la région côtière syrienne : une intégration nationale ambiguë" (in French). Tours: Université François Rabelais.
