= 2015–2016 Latakia offensive =

Military operation

- Part of the Syrian Civil War and the Russian military intervention in the Syrian Civil War
- Syrian Army control (including Hezbollah) Syrian opposition control (including al-Nusra Front) Ongoing confrontation or unclear situation
Date	15 October 2015 – 12 March 2016 (4 months, 3 weeks and 5 days)
Location	Latakia Governorate, Syria
Status	Syrian Army and allies victory
Territorial changes	Government forces capture over 750 square kilometers of territory in northeastern Latakia, which represents 64% of rebel territory in the province; Government forces capture 50 villages, including the rebel strongholds of Salma, Rabia and Kinsabba; Government forces capture most of the Turkmen Mountain and Jabal al-Akrad

Belligerents
(Syria) Syrian Arab Republic: Syrian Armed Forces; Syrian Social Nationalist Party; Syrian Resistance; Hezbollah; LAAG; Lions of Hussein Brigade Russia (air strikes): Russian Air Force; Military advisors	Free Syrian Army; Ahrar ash-Sham; Ansar al-Sham; Movement of Salah al-Din the Kurd; Al-Nusra Front; Turkistan Islamic Party in Syria (TIP); Ajnad al-Kavkaz; Supported by: Turkey

Commanders and leaders
Abu Fatima al-Musawi (LAAG commander); Hussein Tawfiq al-Assad (Lions of Hussein Brigade leader)	Cpt. Basil Zamo † (1st Coastal Division leader) ‘Ali Durayi † (Jabal al-Akrad Ahrar ash-Sham commander); Abu Omar al-Turkistani (al-Nusra and TIP senior commander); Abdel-Aziz Al-Dibaykhi † (Jabal al-Akrad al-Nusra commander)

Units involved
Syrian Armed Forces; Syrian Army; Republican Guard; 103rd Brigade; Syrian Marines; Desert Hawks Brigade; Military Intelligence Directorate; Military Security Shield Forces; National Defence Forces; Syrian Air Force; Russian Armed Forces: Russian Special Operations Forces	(Syria) Free Syrian Army; 1st Coastal Division; (Syria) 2nd Coastal Division; Al-Nusra Front; Katibat Jabal al-Islam

Casualties and losses
(Syria) 112 soldiers killed (12–25 Jan. & 26 Feb. 2016) (Russia) 3 soldiers killed 1 Su-24M bomber shot down 1 Mi-8AMTsh helicopter destroyed	302+ killed (124 foreigners)

The 2015–2016 Latakia offensive was a campaign of the Syrian Civil War that was launched by government forces in October 2015 to recapture rebel-held territory in the Latakia Governorate bordering Turkey.

== The offensive ==
=== Initial government advances ===
On 15 October, government forces launched a large-scale offensive in the northern Latakia countryside. On 19 October, the SAA captured Point 1112, Point 482, Tal Thamamiyah, Kawa Al-Hatab, and Tal Thalatha in the Al-Zahiyah Mountains in northern Latakia after advancing north from the hilltop of Tal Ziwayk. The next day, Russian air strikes killed Basil Zamo, the commander of the rebel 1st Coastal Division, along with four other fighters according to one report. Other reports put the death toll from the attack at 45, including at least 15 civilians.

On 30 October, rebels recaptured areas at Kafar Delbah, but pro-government forces denied this.

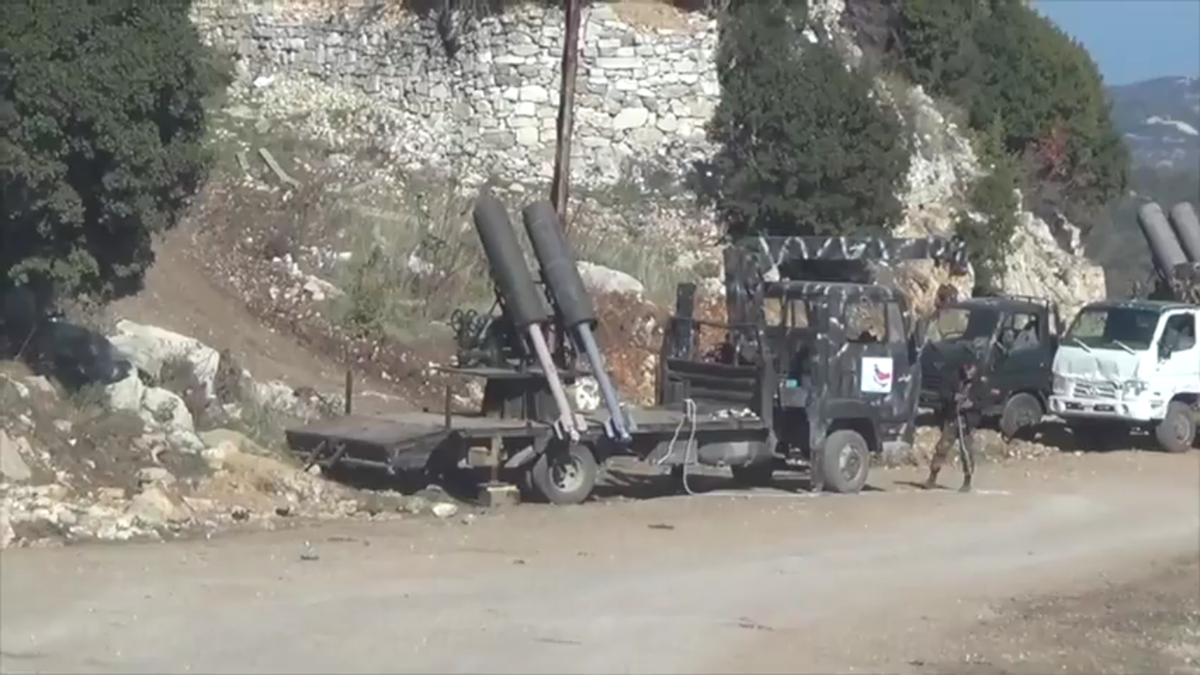
Two double hell cannon technicals used by the NDF during the Battle of Ghamam

Between 1 and 3 November, heavy clashes for the village of Ghammam in the Mountains of northern Latakia took place. The village was captured four times, with the rebels finally ending up controlling it again. Thirteen soldiers and an unknown number of rebels were killed. Two days later, government forces captured three villages in the area and on 6 November took control of Ghamam and Jabal Bakdash hill overlooking it.

On 9 and 10 November, the rebels were reported to have recaptured some points in the area of Ghamam. However, this was denied by military sources.

Between 13 and 23 November, government troops seized 200 square kilometers of territory. On 25 November, they captured three hills (including Tal Al-Yakdash hill) in the mountains of Latakia, advanced around Ghamam and captured the villages of Dayr Hanna, al-Dughmishlyia and Beit ‘Ayyash.

Between 18 and 23 November, government forces captured 10 hills (including six in the Jeb al-Ahmar area), three villages and imposed full control over the Al-Zahi Mountains.

On 24 November, rebels retook the Al-Zahi Mountains and Tal al-Etyra, while government forces captured a village and hilltop on Jabal Sheikh Mohammad. The following day, government forces advanced in the areas of the Al-Zahi Mountains and Ateera, and recaptured Al-Zahi.

=== Turkish shootdown of Russian plane ===
On 24 November, Turkish F-16's downed a Russian Sukhoi Su-24 near the Syrian-Turkish border. A Russian pilot was killed, while another Russian soldier died in the rescue operation that took place in the northern Latakia mountain area. A Russian rescue helicopter was also destroyed by a TOW crew. The crew remained unharmed. Later that day, the second pilot reached the military airport of Latakia after he was rescued by special forces.

Jabal Turkman was subjected to intense bombardment by the Russians after the shootdown of its bomber jet by the Turkish Air Force.

On 27 November, the al-Qaeda-linked al-Nusra Front and the Turkistan Islamic Party in Syria fought against Syrian government and Hezbollah forces around Jabal Nuba, as the Syrian army bombarded them with artillery and Russian warplanes bombed Jabal al-Akrad. The Syrian Army's intense artillery bombardment with hundreds of rockets killed 15 fighters of the Turkistan Islamic Party along with its military leader in Jabal Turkman. Turkistan Islamic Party reported over 30 killed in clashes with government forces during the week. On the same day, government forces captured two more hills and secured Jabal Al-Nuba mountain.

=== Continued government advances ===
On 1 December, government forces captured three villages and the Jabal Al-Kashkar Mountains. With these advances, the Army was in full control of the al-Jeb al-Ahmar area.

Between 3 and 15 December, government forces captured up to 20 villages and hills. During this time, Islamist rebels also retook several checkpoints around Jabal al-Nawabah. Two rebel commanders were killed by Russian airstrikes in Latakia Northern countryside.

On 16 December, government forces captured the strategic Al-Nuba Mountains (Jabal Al-Nuba) in the northern countryside of Latakia. On the same day, they also seized two hilltops which are located on the border of the Idlib governorate.

Between 17 and 20 December, government forces captured another 10 villages and points along the Turkish border, while the rebels retook the Jabal Al-Sayed Mountains and partly retook the Jabal Al-Nuba mountain.

On 23 and 24 December, government forces supported by Russian air-strikes, reportedly recaptured the Jabal Al-Nuba mountain and the Jabal Al-Sayed Mountains.

Between 25 December and 10 January, government forces imposed full control over two dozen more villages and hills, including the Katf Al-Alamah area. Of these, the rebels managed to recapture only two villages.

=== Capture of Salma and Rabia ===
On the morning of 12 January, government forces imposed full control over the strategic village of Tartiyah, situated to the east of the rebel stronghold of Salma, considered to be the rebel's most important site in the Kurdish Mountains (Jabal al-Akrad) in the northern countryside of Latakia. Later that day, the military fully seized Salma.

The following day, the military expanded its control from Salma, capturing Mrouniyah and Marj Khawkha. By 15 January, they took control of another six villages as rebel defenses collapsed.

On 16 January 2016, government forces captured several hills overlooking al-Sarraf, as well as another six villages.

On the next day, the military seized two mountaintops near the strategic town of Rabia and six villages throughout Jabal Al-Akrad and the Turkmen Mountain.

On 20 January, government advances continued with the seizure of another two villages. However, a rebel counter-attack between 18 and 20 January, led to their recapture of four villages and a hill. Still, their hold on these recaptured positions was weak due to government troops still occupying the strategic heights.

On 21 January, a renewed Army assault commenced and by 24 January, they captured 20 villages, surrounding the strategic town of Rabia on three sides. Rabia itself was seized that day.

In all, between 12 and 25 January, Russian and Syrian warplanes conducted more than 522 airstrikes, while government ground forces fired more than 3,000 rocket shells and missiles, which led to them taking control of 36 towns and villages, the most important of all being Salma and Rabia, which were the main rebel strongholds in Jabal al-Akrad and Jabal al-Turkman. A total of 72 Syrian soldiers and 124 foreign rebel fighters were killed during these two weeks of operations.

=== SAA push towards Kinsabba ===
Between 27 and 31 January, government forces captured seven villages, Ruweisat Al-Nimr hill and Jabal Al-Mulqa mountain.

On 1 February, the rebels recaptured Nawarah (Kelez), near the Turkish border, after government forces had completely withdrawn from the village and its surrounding hills. Meanwhile, east of Jabal al-Turkman (Turkmen Mountains), government forces continued to advance north towards the rebel stronghold of Kinsabba.

On 3 February, a Russian military advisor training Syrian soldiers in the use of "new weapons" was killed by rebel mortar shelling in Salma. Three other Russian soldiers were wounded.

Between 6 and 7 February, government troops captured the village of Aliyah (Krouja) and its hill. On the same day, the 103rd Brigade of the Republican Guard and other Syrian paramilitaries crossed a river capturing the village of Bashura. The attack was heavily assisted by Russian airstrikes which targeted Al-Nusra Front and FSA 1st Coastal Brigade defenses. On 8 February, they further advanced and seized four villages, including two in the area of Kinsabba.

On 9 February, the Saudi national and senior Al-Nusra Front commander of the Kurdish Mountains, Abdel-Aziz Al-Dibaykhi (nom de guerre "Abu Hamza") was killed by the Republican Guard's 103rd Brigade. At least 16 Al-Nusra Front fighters were killed by Russian air-strikes as the military regained several positions they had previously lost. Two days later, the rebels recaptured two villages, including Krouja, following fighting that left 12 soldiers dead. On 13 February, the military regained several positions they had lost, including a village.

On 14 February, the Army seized three villages, and the following day another seven sites as they pressed towards Kinsabba. With the capture of two more villages on 16 February, the military reached Kinsabba and preparations were started for a final assault on the town. Due to the re-allocation of most of the rebel forces from Tal Ghazaleh hill, that overlooks the Turkish border, to reinforce the defense of Kinsabba, government forces used the opportunity, assaulted the hill and captured it. The attack on Kinsabba started on 17 February, quickly capturing three villages on its western flank and leaving one road open for the rebels to retreat. Kinsabba was secured the following morning. Following this advance, the next aim of the Army was the village of Kabani, one of the highest points in Jabal al-Akrad, that overlooks the Al-Ghaab Plains, and from where the rebels still had the ability to shell places like Qardaha.

=== Final operations ===
Between 20 and 23 February, the Army continued its advances and captured eight villages and a hill north of Kinsabba. On 26 February, government troops took control of Ayn Al-Bayda, on the provincial border between Latakia and Idlib, and on the following day, they seized the village of Saraf and Tal Nawarat hill, that overlooks a Nusra-held border crossing with Turkey.

On 2 March, the military launched an assault on Kabani and its hill. Elsewhere, they reportedly captured three villages and a hill. Ten days later, the strategic height of Kabani hill (Hill 1154) was taken by government forces. During this time, the Army also seized the Zuweiqat mountaintop overlooking Kabani. Still, opposition activists reported on 9 March that the rebels had recaptured Zuweiqat.

== Aftermath ==
Al-Nusra-led rebels launched an assault in mid-April 2016, capturing parts of Jabal al-Qalat (Qalat Mountain) and al-Bayda village. The Syrian Army mounted a counter-attack within days and re-captured all positions they had lost, continuing with the assault on the heights around Kabani again. In the course of the fighting, a prominent al-Nusra Front commander was killed: Abu Shakkar, nicknamed "The Cannibal" because he ate the heart of a Syrian soldier.

Between 14 and 29 April, government forces made 10 unsuccessful attempts at capturing two strategic hills on the outskirts of Kabani. As of 30 April, there were contradictory reports who controlled height 1154 as a 3-day ceasefire came into effect.

On 30 May, the Army captured the Tall Haddadeh hilltop, which overlooks the Turkish border and remaining rebel-held villages in northern Latakia.

At the end of June, the al-Nusra-led Army of Conquest, supported by FSA groups, launched a counter-offensive on the Turkman and Kurd Mountains, capturing several villages before they withdrew under Russian airstrikes. A total of 33 rebels and 15 soldiers were killed in the fighting. Still, a second rebel assault a few days later managed to capture Kinsabba, as well as a dozen nearby villages and hills. On 8 August, the Syrian Army regained Kinsabba and its surrounding villages and hills during a counter-offensive.

== Strategic analysis ==
According to analysis by pro-opposition Al Jazeera, the objective of the Latakia offensive was to consolidate a potential Alawi dominated state (supported by Russia) that would extend from the Coast to Damascus, passing by Hama and Homs. This would entail forcing the population to leave the north of Latakia so that they would be replaced by government supporters. According to the same source, the offensive aims also at embarrassing and pressuring the Turkish government since most of the population in north Latakia are from Turkmen origin. The source attributes the advance by government troops to the powerful missiles used by the Russian airforce and to the lack of support from rebels in Idlib and Hama governorates.

On the other hand, the Syrian government claims to be aiming to reconquer the whole of Syria. In this case, after recovering all of Latakia, the next logical step might be to move into neighboring Idlib and recover what was lost to the opposition earlier in the year.

== See also ==
- 2016 Latakia offensive
