= Muzayraa =

Town in northwestern Syria

Muzayraa مزيرعة Mzeraa
- Town
- Mazirah
- Location in Syria
- Coordinates: 35°31′52″N 36°4′16″E
- Country: Syria
- Governorate: Latakia
- District: al-Haffah
- Subdistrict: Muzayraa

Population (2004)
  - Total: 834
- Time zone: UTC+2 (EET)
  - Summer (DST): UTC+3 (EEST)

Muzayraa (Arabic: مزيرعة, romanized: Muzayri`ah, Mzera'a or Mazirah) is a town in northwestern Syria administratively part of the Latakia Governorate, located east of Latakia. Nearby localities include Difa and Hanadi to the west, al-Jandiriyah to the northwest, al-Haffah and Ayn al-Tineh to the north, Slinfah to the northeast, Shathah to the east and Qardaha to the south. According to the Syria Central Bureau of Statistics (CBS), Muzayraa had a population was 834 in the 2004 census. It is the administrative center and the fourth largest locality of the Muzayraa nahiyah ("subdistrict") which contained 27 localities with a collective population of 13,908 in 2004. Its inhabitants are predominantly Christians.

On 14 December 2024, former members of the Syrian Arab Army launched an attack in the settlement on Sham Corps members affiliated with the Syrian transitional government. The incident represents the first clash of its kind since the collapse of the Assad regime.

== Bibliography ==
- Balanche, Fabrice (2006). La région alaouite et le pouvoir syrien (in French). Karthala Editions. ISBN 2845868189.
