= Ayn al-Tineh, Latakia Governorate =

Town in northwestern Syria

Ayn al-Tineh عين التينة
- Town
- Location in Syria
- Coordinates: 35°33′50″N 36°6′0″E
- Country: Syria
- Governorate: Latakia
- District: Ayn al-Tineh
- Subdistrict: Ayn al-Tineh
- Elevation: 800 m (2,625 ft)

Population (2004)
  - Total: 1,333
- Time zone: UTC+2 (EET)
  - Summer (DST): UTC+3 (EEST)

Ayn al-Tineh (Arabic: عين التينة, Ain al-Tineh) is a town in northwestern Syria administratively belonging to the Latakia Governorate, located east of Latakia. Nearby localities include the district center of al-Haffah to the northwest, Slinfah to the northeast, Farikah and Nabl al-Khatib to the east, Shathah to the southeast, Muzayraa to the south and al-Shir to the west. According to the Syria Central Bureau of Statistics (CBS), Ayn al-Tineh had a population was 1,333 in 2004. It is the administrative center of the Ayn al-Tineh nahiyah ("subdistrict") which contains 13 localities with a collective population of 6,825. Its inhabitants predominantly Alawites.

It is situated on a limestone spur in the northern an-Nusayriyah Mountains, with an average elevation of 800 meters above sea level. Located between al-Haffah and Muzayraa, Ayn al-Tineh is separated from the two towns by wadis. 'Ayn al-Tineh' is also the name of a spring that flows under the nearby Citadel of Salah Ed-Din.

== History ==
Ayn al-Tineh was historically a fief of the Kheirbek clan, a prominent family in the Syrian security forces and part of the Kalbiyya tribal confederation. From Ayn al-Tineh, the Kheirbek often launched raids against the Ottoman authorities in the coastal plain and against the Sunni Muslim villages in the nearby Jabal Sahyoun area around al-Haffah. The topographic advantages of the village often made for an impregnable defense from the Ottoman government forces. During the French Mandate period (1923–1946), many of the men of Ayn al-Tineh, through the Kheirbek's good offices with the French, enrolled into the Special Troops of the Levant.

Following Syrian independence, the residents of Ayn al-Tineh continued their tradition of military service, and many officers from there advanced under the Presidency of Hafez al-Assad, himself a member of the Kalbiyya. According to French researcher Fabrice Balanche, Ayn al-Tineh is one of a number of villages in the coastal mountain region, like al-Tawahin, that is largely dependent on the Syrian Army and the state, finding abundant employment in the former and within the internal security services. The poverty of the village is a significant motivational factor in the high rate of employment in the security forces and the consequent backing of the ruling Assad family. This is in contrast to other impoverished Alawite villages in the region which that have historically been at odds with the prominent Alawite families and have not received the extent of benefits from state income that Ayn al-Tineh does. In 1972 it was made a nahiya (subdistrict) center. In 1975, a road connecting Ayn al-Tineh directly with the city of Latakia was built, allowing it to bypass the more arduous north-south route through the district capital of al-Haffah. The village obtained its telephone network in 1978 and was connected to the electric grid in 1980.

During the middle and end of late President Hafez al-Assad's term in the 1980s and 1990s, a hussainia (Shia Muslim congregational mosque) was founded in Ayn al-Tineh. It was the smallest one built by the al-Murtada movement, measuring 40 square meters. While during Hafez's rule the hussainias served largely for local opposition meetings, this changed when relations between Shia Muslim-majority Iran and Syria increased dramatically with the coming to power of current President Bashar al-Assad.

== Bibliography ==
- Balanche, Fabrice (2000). "Les Alaouites, l'espace et le pouvoir dans la région côtière syrienne : une intégration nationale ambiguë" (in French). Tours: Université François Rabelais.
- Balanche, Fabrice (2006). La région alaouite et le pouvoir syrien (in French). Karthala Editions. ISBN 2845868189.
- Boulanger, Robert, ed. (1966). The Middle East, Lebanon, Syria, Jordan, Iraq, Iran. Hachette.
