= Jabal al-Akrad =

Mountain range in Syria

- جبل الأكراد
- Location within Syria

Highest point
- Elevation: 400–1,000 m (1,300–3,300 ft)
- Coordinates: 35°39′N 36°12′E

Naming
- Etymology: Mountain of the Kurds

Geography
- Location: Latakia Governorate and Idlib Governorate, Syria
- Country: Syria
- Parent range: Syrian Coastal Mountain Range

Geology
- Rock type: Chalk

Jabal al-Akrad (Arabic: جبل الأكراد Jabal al-Akrād, lit. Mountain of the Kurds) is a rural mountainous region with an elevation that ranges from 400–1,000 meters (1,300–3,300 ft) above sea level, in northwestern Syria at the northern end of the Coastal Mountain Range or Jabal Ansariya. It is located in the northeastern Latakia Governorate, near the borders with Idlib Governorate and Turkey.

The region is rich in forests and natural resources. As a result of the Syrian civil war the region has seen numerous military clashes between the armed opposition groups and the Syrian army.

== Geography ==
The region represents the northernmost part of the Jabal Ansariya range, also referred to as the Syrian Coastal Mountain Range. The tributaries of the Nahr al-Kabir al-Shamali form deep ravines across Jabal al-Akrad's chalk relief. The region is separated from the adjacent Jabal Turkman (also called the Bayir or Baer) region by the Nahr al-Kabir al-Shamali.

== Demography ==
Jabal al-Akrad is largely populated by Sunni Muslims descended from Kurdish tribes that became Arabized several centuries ago. The name of the mountain, Jabal al-Akrad ('Mountain of the Kurds'), preserves a vestige of this heritage. The anthropologist Fabrice Balanche notes Kurdish tribesmen were settled in the area in a military capacity by the Mamluk sultan Baybars and his successors in the 13th century to secure the route between Aleppo and the Syrian coast. The 19th-century German traveler Martin Hartmann noted that Sunni Muslim residents in the Ottoman nahiyah (subdistrict) of Jabal al-Akrad claimed descent from Kurds who were forced to settle in the region in the 16th century but no longer spoke Kurdish and had been fully Arabized.

== Settlements ==
The region was densely populated, with about 150 people per square kilometer in the late 1990s. Contributing factors for the close grouping of the rural settlements there include the abundance of hills and springs, but especially the close-knit social organization of the inhabitants. A clear marker of the Sunni Muslim identity of the area are the plethora of mosques across the landscape, a distinction from the predominantly Alawite countryside of the Jabal Ansariya. Jabal al-Akrad administratively corresponds with the nahiya of Kinsabba and the northern area of the nahiya of Slinfeh, both subordinate to the al-Haffah District of the Latakia Governorate, as well as part of Bidama and Jisr al-Shughur nahiyas of the Idlib Governorate.

Kinsabba historically was a mostly Greek Orthodox Christian village (one of the few Christian communities in Jabal al-Akrad), though Muslims accounted for about four-fifths of the population by 1994, up from one-third in the 1935 census. The population of the village was about 500 in 2004 and its subdistrict over 17,000 between 35 settlements. The largest settlement in Jabal al-Akrad is the small town of Salma, which had a population of about 2,100 in the 2004 census. It also serves as a summer resort and due to the community's conservative Muslim character, it generally caters to conservative Muslim families from Latakia and Aleppo. Summer resorting began to proliferate in Jabal al-Akrad, such as to the villages of Uwainat and Ghanimiyeh, with the spread of public services to most of the area's villages in the 1980s and the high volume of tourism in Salma.

== Syrian civil war ==
In early 2012, during the early stage of the Syrian civil war, local rebels opposed to the government gained control over Jabal al-Akrad and much of the far north of Latakia Governorate and the border with Turkey. In July 2012, they gained a foothold in Jabal Sahyun (the area around al-Haffah) but withdrew amid days of heavy fighting with government forces. Jabal al-Akrad became a frontline in the war until its recapture by government forces in 2015–2016. By then, much of the population had fled the area due to the fighting and as of 2017, the area remained largely depopulated of its former inhabitants. In 2024, the Kurdish Islamist group, Jama'at Ansar al-Islam, peaked in incursions in the area, killing dozens of SAA soldiers in the process. In 2025 following the collapse of Bashar's government, the same group took control of the mountain range and its population. Ansar al-Islam also revealed that it lived in the caves of the mountains for years since the start of their insurgency in Syria.

== See also ==
- Kadin, Syria
- Latakia Governorate
- Murshidiyya
- Alawites
- Syrian Civil War

== Sources ==
- Balanche, Fabrice (2000). "Les Alaouites, l'espace et le pouvoir dans la région côtière syrienne : une intégration nationale ambiguë" (in French). Tours: Université François Rabelais.
- Balanche, Fabrice (2018). "Sectarianism in Syria's Civil War" (PDF). The Washington Institute for Near East Policy.
