= Aramo, Syria =

Aramo عرامو Արամօ ʿAramo
- Village
- Location in Syria
- Coordinates: 35°37′35.5″N 36°07′53.8″E
- Country: Syria
- Governorate: Latakia Governorate
- District: Al-Haffah District
- Nahiyah: Slinfah

Population (2004 census)
  - Total: 490
- Time zone: UTC+2 (EET)
  - Summer (DST): UTC+3 (EEST)

Aramo (Arabic: عرامو, ʿAramo, Armenian: Արամօ, Aramo) is a Syrian village located in Latakia Governorate north west of the country. Aramo is just 30 km from the Mediterranean Sea. According to the Syria Central Bureau of Statistics, Aramo had a population of 490 in the 2004 census.

== History ==
The village was part of the Ugaritic kingdom and was mentioned as 'Arime in the archives of the city c. 1300 BC.

== Armenians ==
The village is known to be populated by Armenians, but in 1947 they left in large numbers to Soviet Armenia. Now a few families live there. The town has an old Armenian church called Saint Stepanos built in 1310. It stands in the middle of the village. There are also some small churches carved in the rocks such as Surp Asdvadzadzin and Surp Kevork Armenian Apostolic churches. The Alawite Arabs also visit those two churches.

Nowadays, there is a small number of Armenian inhabitants in Aramo, most of whom speak the Arabic language. There was a census around 2021 by the Syrian government counting around 255 Armenians in total in the city, making them half of the city of Aramo's population.

== See also ==
- Armenians in Syria
- Kesab
- List of Armenian ethnic enclaves
