= Babna =

Babna بابنا Babanna, Bab Ana
- Village
- Location within Syria
- Coordinates: 35°37′17″N 36°2′28″E
- Country: Syria
- Governorate: Latakia
- District: Al-Haffah
- Subdistrict: Al-Haffah

Population (2004 census)
  - Total: 802
- Time zone: UTC+2 (EET)
  - Summer (DST): UTC+3 (EEST)

Babna (Arabic: بابنا, romanized: Bābnā, also spelled Babanna or Bab Ana) is a village in northwestern Syria, administratively part of the al-Haffah District, located northeast of Latakia and 10 kilometers (6.2 mi) north of al-Haffah city. According to the Syria Central Bureau of Statistics, Babna had a population of 802 in the 2004 census. Its inhabitants are Sunni Muslims.

== History ==
Babna was recorded in Ottoman tax registers in 1519 and 1547 as part of the Sahyun district and was assessed 620 dirhams in taxes. From the early 19th century, during Ottoman rule (1517–1918), until 1924, during French Mandatory rule (1923–1946), Babna had been the capital of the Sahyun kaza (district). The French transferred this administrative role to nearby al-Haffah. Prior to its demotion, Babna had around 2,000 inhabitants, including most of the major landlords of its hinterland, a large mosque, an administrative court, a seray (government house), and a busy souk (bazaar). Afterward, it rapidly declined in population, with its notables and their clients moving to the cities of Latakia and Jableh. Today, it is a small village. The old mosque and some of the large villas of its former inhabitants remained as of the 1990s. In 1994, its population was 711.

During the Syrian civil war, in June 2012, there were heavy clashes between rebels and government forces in Babna, al-Haffah and surrounding communities. In April 2022, residents or returnees to Babna began applying for permits to rebuild or repair homes damaged in the village during the fighting.

== Bibliography ==
- Balanche, Fabrice (2000). "Les Alaouites, l'espace et le pouvoir dans la région côtière syrienne : une intégration nationale ambiguë" (in French). Tours: Université François Rabelais.
- Winter, Stefan (2016). A History of the 'Alawis: From Medieval Aleppo to the Turkish Republic. Princeton and Oxford: Princeton University Press. ISBN 9780691167787.
