= Battle of al-Haffah =

2012 battle in Syria

Battle of al-Haffah معركة الحفة
- Part of the Syrian Civil War
Date	5–13 June 2012 (1 week and 1 day)
Location	Al-Haffah, Latakia Governorate, Syria
Result	Syrian Army victory

Belligerents
Free Syrian Army	(Syria) Syrian Arab Republic: Syrian Armed Forces

Units involved
Unknown	10th Mechanized Division: 56th Armoured Brigade

Strength
300+ fighters	780 soldiers

Casualties and losses
23 killed	68 killed 200 wounded
- 29 civilians killed

The Battle of al-Haffah (Arabic: معركة الحفة) took place between the Syrian Army and the rebel Free Syrian Army (FSA) in Latakia Governorate, primarily in the area around the town of Al-Haffah. The battle resulted in the ousting of the rebels from Al-Haffah.

== Background ==
Haffah is a Sunni Muslim town that lies in the foothills of the coastal mountains that form the heartland of Assad's Alawi sect. It is strategically located close to the port city of Latakia, as well as the Turkish border which has been used by the rebels to smuggle people and supplies.

== Event ==
=== Rebels capture Al-Haffah ===
The fighting started on 5 June 2012, in Al-Haffah, when a large concentration of FSA rebels attacked and captured the town's police stations. Soon after, government forces surrounded the city and began an attack. The opposition claimed at least five government tanks and armoured personnel carriers were destroyed in the fighting. Clashes also broke out in the nearby villages of Bakas, Shirqaq, Babna, Jankil, and Dafil.

=== Army counter-attack ===
The fighting continued into the next day with government forces shelling the village of Shirqaq and continuing to assault Al-Haffah, where tanks and helicopters joined the fighting. The helicopters strafed suspected rebel positions. On the first day of the battle 33 people were killed: 22 soldiers, nine rebels and two civilians. On the second day seven people were killed due to the shelling, including one rebel fighter. By 7 June, a number of rebels retreated from Al-Haffah to the al-Ghab area under heavy helicopter fire, but not before they freed several prisoners, abducted a number of police officers and bulldozed the local police station and secret police offices.

Army troop reinforcements arrived to the area on 10 June, and the military continued to bombard the town and surrounding villages for a sixth straight day. Most of the rebels retreated to the surrounding mountainous area around Al-Haffah, which is a Sunni Muslim enclave, and entrenched themselves. The next day, the US government reported that it feared the Syrian government was planning a new massacre in al-Haffah, where fighting had killed 68 soldiers, 29 civilians and 23 rebel fighters. The city continued to endure heavy shelling from the Army. The FSA reported the same day that they had moved civilians away from the city centre to protect them, but even the outskirts were shelled eventually.

=== Army recaptures Al-Haffah ===
On 12 June, the military recaptured al-Haffah and the remaining 200 FSA fighters under heavy bombardment by government forces withdrew from the town. The rebels were reported to have retreated to Turkey. The FSA called the pullout a tactical retreat, to avoid the killing of more civilians. The rebels claimed that heavy shelling of the town had caused significant damage to the area's infrastructure and shortages in water and electricity supplies. In addition, the FSA statement said the withdrawal from the town and its suburbs was to avoid another "massacre" and orders were reportedly given to FSA fighters to evacuate the injured and killed civilians, which included women and children.

== Aftermath ==
UN observers were blocked from entering the city during the battle, but received reports of civilians trapped and unable to leave. After the battle, UN monitors were met with the "smell of death", as they entered the deserted town of al-Haffah which had been shelled for eight consecutive days. The UN observers found the Sunni Muslim town completely abandoned with burned out wrecks of cars and at least one charred body lying on a street.

== See also ==
- Houla massacre
- Al-Kubeir massacre
