= Katibat Jabal al-Islam =

Syrian Turkmen militant organization

- كتيبة جبل الإسلام
- Leader: Sheikh Fidaa Kharbatli
- Military leader: Zahir Abu Usama
- Spokesperson: Abu Obeida
- Dates active: 2012-2025
- Ideology: Salafi jihadism
- Size: ~460
- Part of: Al-Nusra Front (2012-2017); Hay'at Tahrir al-Sham (2017-2025)
- Wars: Syrian civil war; 2015–2016 Latakia offensive; Idlib demilitarization (2018–2019); Northwestern Syria clashes (December 2022–November 2024)

Katibat Jabal al-Islam (Arabic: كتيبة جبل الإسلام, romanized: Katībat Jabal al-Islām, lit. 'Mountain of Islam Battalion', Turkish: İslam Dağı Taburu) or Jabal al-Islam Battalion is a jihadist group made up of mostly Syrian Turkmen established in 2012 in the Bayırbucak region of the northern Latakia area.

== History ==
The group was established in 2012 in the Latakia area, specifically in the Jabal al-Turkman area, with a present-day estimate of 300 members with the group being an offshoot of Al-Nusra Front with the main goal being to "make Allah's law the rule of law in the land.". After Al-Nusra Front and other organizations merged into Hay'at Tahrir al-Sham in 2017, Katibat Jabal al-Islam followed suit and pledged allegiance to Hay'at Tahrir al-Sham. During their operations in the Latakia governante, Katibat Jabal al-Islam worked alongside the Free Syrian Army including the American backed 10th brigade, though working under Hay'at Tahrir al-Sham and also receiving 30-60 Turkish backed militants in their organization, the group is considered an independent Salafi Jihadist organization. Despite their association with designated terrorist organizations, Katibat Jabal al-Islam is not designated as a terrorist organization by any official government. The organization held ceremonies including Islamic marriages and other celebrations with its members. Katibat Jabal al-Islam is considered a close ally with the Turkistan Islamic Party in Syria as they're both considered Pan-Turkist, this is similar to Ansar al-Islam and Hurras al-Din. Though most of the members are Syrian Turkmen, some members are Moroccan Arabs. In 2016, Katibat Jabal al-Islam pledged its support for Salafi Islamic clerics in Syria of the Assembly of al-Sham Scholars which included the Shari'i clerics in Syria affiliated with militarism like Abdullah al-Muhaysini and Abu Maria al-Qahtani. In 2021 Katibat Jabal al-Islam was listed on Facebook's Dangerous Individuals and Organizations List for being associated with terrorism, under its Turkish name, İslam Dağı Taburu. On 24 January 2024, the French government froze all assets belonging to Katibat Jabal al-Islam in France with 24 other groups affiliated with terrorism in Syria as seen by the French after the advances in Latakia and Hama.

=== Attacks ===
==== 2015 ====
In April 2015, members of Katibat Jabal al-Islam detonated an improvised explosive device near the military patrol Tower 45, killing 4 officers and 3 non-commissioned officers including Colonel Samer Khalil from the village of Al-Drikish. The device was planted ~500 meters (1,640 feet) away from the patrol tower.

In July 2015, Katibat Jabal al-Islam participated in attacks in Othman Hill in Jabal al-Turkman and strikes against the Beit Awan military base alongside other Al-Nusra Front groups in order to recapture land that was in control of the regime forces.

In December 2015, they began clashing with members of the 2nd Coastal Brigade of the Syrian Arab Army.

==== 2016 ====
During the 2015–2016 Latakia offensive, Katibat Jabal al-Islam took over the Jabal al-Islam area after battles with Russian militants and Iranian backed Shia groups. These areas include the strategic points of Gimam, Kizylag, Avanli (Beyt Avan), Tardakli (Beyt Gazebak), Karabacli, Saray, Ablak (Beyt Ablak), Dagagan after 11 months of battle with both regime forces and Iranian backed Shia militant organizations.

On 27 January, Katibat Jabal al-Islam released a statement regarding the killing of three Syrian regime forces by a sniper on the axes of Mount Turkmen.

==== 2017 ====
During and after the dissolution of Al-Nusra Front infighting between ideological allies of Katibat Jabal al-Islam began, especially after an attack by the Mujahideen Army precipitated wider infighting between Al-Nusra Front aligned organizations and other insurgent factions.

==== 2018 ====
In 2018, the commander of the military of Katibat Jabal al-Islam, Zahir Abu Usama, made statements to the Turkish-sponsored news Anadolu Agency stating that members of the organization had attacked Russian-backed militants in the Turkmen Mountain in revenge for the attacks against Idlib where Russian warplanes struck Katibat Jabal al-Islam militants in the Turkmen Mountains. They attacked regime soldiers in the areas of Bayırbucak with the initial hopes that these attacks would lessen the attacks against Hay'at Tahrir al-Sham's de facto capital, Idlib, by the Russian Air Force. Through these attacks, Katibat Jabal al-Islam took the villages of Villas and Qapi Kaya farms, killing a large number of regime soldiers.

In the initial revenge attack they targeted Mount Sarraf killing 17 Syrian regime soldiers after entering an estimated 12 kilometers (7.45 miles) across the line of control by the Syrian regime alongside Hay'at Tahrir al-Sham and Hurras al-Din. On the same day a car bomb went off near the Tishreen suburb, near Sheikh Mahmoud Road in Latakia, wounding two civilians. The next day, on 22 January, Katibat Jabal al-Islam with Hay'at Tahrir al-Sham attacked Syrian regime points in Mount Sarraf again killing 20 Syrian Regime soldiers and injuring 15. Afterwards, they led attacks on Qabi Qaya and Al-Filla where they also seized sizeable quantities of military equipment including light weaponry, and destroyed tents that were being used by the Syrian regime soldiers. They also claimed the destruction of an MD missile base. In response to the operations in Mount Sarraf, regime soldiers shelled areas of Al-Yamdiyah and Al-Salur from the Al-Bayda observatories and Abu Ali hill though there were no reports of casualties on the side of the Syrian opposition. During this, Katibat Jabal al-Islam participated in an Inghimasi operation alongside Hay'at Tahrir al-Sham against Russian militants and Syrian government forces nicknamed Operation "Allah torments you in your hands" where Katibat Jabal al-Islam militants killed 12 regime soldiers and destroyed many vehicles with the first operation while simultaneously members of the 1st Coastal Division destroyed a Syrian 9M133 Kornet with a 9K111 Fagot. The next day (23 January 2018), Katibat Jabal al-Islam conducted two ambushes which, according to the group, led to the death of 9 regime fighters with many of these ambushes reportedly took place in the area of Mount Sarraf. The attacked continued by Katibat Jabal al-Islam targeting Jabal al-Bayda, al-Zahiya, Abu Ali Hill, and al-Zalazal Hill with the leader of the organization, Sheikh Fidaa Kharbatli, stating that "the group of immersion fighters was able to carry out a qualitative operation in the Sarraf axis, where they infiltrated the regime forces' positions in the area, and killed 15 elements in the operation.", the group was met with heavy tank fire and shelling during this operation. On 24 January 2018, 17 members of the 144th Division of the Syrian Arab Army were killed in total after operations by Katibat Jabal al-Islam targeted positions in Sarraf including Jabal al-Bayda, al-Zahiya, Abu Ali Hill, and al-Zalazal Hill; the leader of the militant group, Sheikh Abu Obeida Fida, released this information. On 25 January 2018, Katibat Jabal al-Islam officially stated that the operation was a success against the Syrian controlled Bayırbucak where 20 Syrian regime soldiers were killed and 19 others were wounded, before this operation, the Syrian regime controlled 80% of the Mount Turkmen area. Katibat Jabal al-Islam also struck Syrian regime soldiers in the area of al-Fakhurah where it killed 9 regime soldiers and injured many others, including three Syrian officers. The destruction also included a Syrian controlled 23×152mmB anti-aircraft cannon and a Syrian humvee, the attacks also included the border of Jabal al-Akrad. Later that day, Katibat Jabal al-Islam militants ambushed regime soldiers in North Latakia killing 5 of them in order to expand their area of control in north Latakia.

On 21 June, Katibat Jabal al-Islam militants clashed with Syrian regime soldiers, killing 15 and injuring 5 where the militants attacked the areas of Qabıkaya, Sarraf and Golcuk and seized military equipment in response to military attacks done the day before by Syrian and Iranian backed militias.

A month later, Katibat Jabal al-Islam killed 17 more regime soldiers in the same areas with help from Hay'at Tahrir al-Sham. The members of Katibat Jabal al-Islam fought both Russian militants and Syrian regime soldiers, with the fighting they took Sarraf and the pushing towards the Hama countryside.

In August 2018, members of Katiat Jabal al-Islam ambushed Syrian regime soldiers in Al-Sarraf killing another 5. During the attacks in August, Islamic State elements attacked multiple Hay'at Tahrir al-Sham groups including Katibat Jabal al-Islam militants in the town and military point of Baida al-Suwayda where an Islamic State suicide bomber blew himself up. After another attack by Katibat Jabal al-Islam they targeted points in the Turkmen Mountain region killing or injuring 16 Syrian soldiers. The Syrian Arab Army thwarted the attack and repelled HTS fighters and their allies, including Katibat Jabal al-Islam in Sarraf from expanding further though the attack killed 4 members of the Syrian regime forces.

In November 2018, Katibat Jabal al-Islam killed 10 members of the regime forces, which was followed by shelling by regime forces on the outskirts of the town of Al-Ziyara and the village of Al-Sarmaniyah. Alongside the Rouse the Believers Operations Room, Katibat Jabal al-Islam raided multiple pro-regime militants in both Latakia and Hama Governorates on 16 November. On 16–17 November, after Syrian regime soldiers targeted areas of Jaysh al-Izza in the northern Hama countryside, Katibat Jabal al-Islam with help from Rouse the Believers Operations Room struck areas of pro-regime forces in Latakia and Hama killing in total 34 regime soldiers and taking control of light and medium weaponry with a statement being released saying: "The Nusayri army points in Tal Burkan Katf Hassoun were raided in the Jabal al-Akrad axis in the Latakia countryside.".

==== 2019 ====
In 2019, Katibat Jabal al-Islam, with help from the Rouse the Believers Operations Room and factions from the National Front for Liberation, took 15 locations in the Latakia governorate including three strategic hills, Al-Fursan Hill, Al-Tahuna Hill, and Al-Zaytouna Hill in Jabal Al-Turkman. This resulted in the deaths of 30 Syrian regime soldiers and the destruction of two tanks with guided missiles from a rocket propelled grenade launcher, and the capture of a third tank in Zahiya Hill where they attempted to continue the offensive towards the capturing of Atira Hill. Katibat Jabal al-Islam also captured heavy, medium and light weapons and various ammunition with images of the attacks and statements were released, 20 military sites were also seized. A video was then released by Rouse the Believers Operations Room where it also talked about jihad and martyrdom entitled "When you enter it, you will be victorious." (Arabic: إِذَا دخْلْتُومُهُ فَنَاكُمْ غَالِبُونَ, romanized: Idhā dkhltūmuhu fanākum ghālibūna) presenting the attacks that happened. The video also featured calls for the freeing of Syrian political prisoners, the video was spread on social media platforms including YouTube. During this time, Assad aligned militants assisted with heavy Russian air support attempted to take back the area.

==== 2020 ====
In 2020, a member of the Katibat Jabal al-Islam was assassinated after conflict with the Russian militants in Latakia. The member was named Abu Abdullah, his assassination would be investigated by the local police force though the information about the investigation was not fully released to the public.
