= Kadin, Syria =

Kadin كدين
- Village
- Location in Syria
- Coordinates: 35°41′24″N 36°10′43″E
- Country: Syria
- Governorate: Latakia
- District: al-Haffah
- Subdistrict: Kinsabba

Population (2004)
  - Total: 552
- Time zone: UTC+3 (EET)
  - Summer (DST): UTC+2 (EEST)
- City Qrya Pcode: C3751

Kadin (Arabic: كدين) is a Syrian village located in the Kinsabba subdistrict of the al-Haffah district in Latakia Governorate. The village had a population of 552 according to the 2004 census. Its residents were Alawites who belonged to the Murshidiyya sect.

During the Syrian Civil War the residents of Kadin, in contrast to neighboring Alawite villages, chose to remain in their homes after the Free Syrian Army took over most of Jabal al-Akrad from the regime in the fall of 2012.

== See also ==
- Al-Haffah District
- Latakia Governorate
- Jabal al-Akrad
- Murshidiyya
- Alawites
- Syrian Civil War
