= Al-Haffah =

Al-Haffah ٱلْحَفَّة
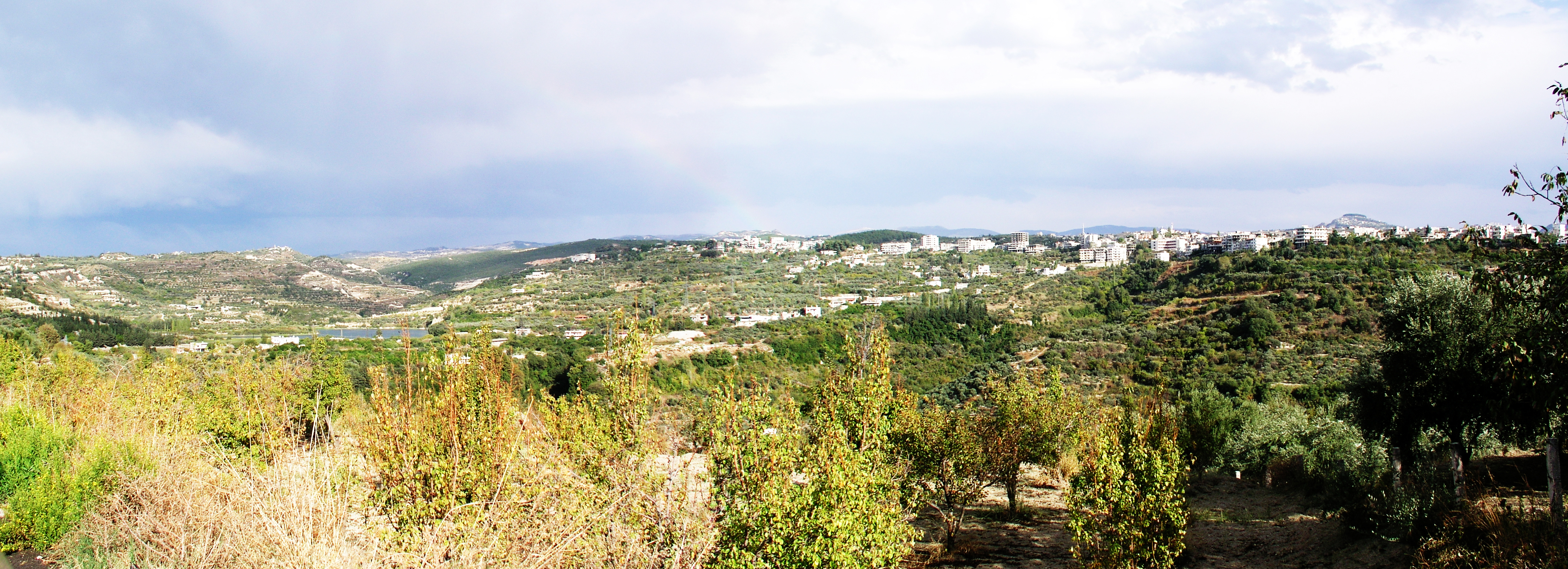
- Landscape near al-Haffah

- Location in Syria
- Coordinates: 35°35′55″N 36°2′6″E
- Country: Syria
- Governorate: Latakia
- District: al-Haffah
- Subdistrict: al-Haffah
- Elevation: 310 m (1,020 ft)

Population (2004 census)
  - City: 4,298
  - Metro: 23,347
- Time zone: UTC+2 (EET)
  - Summer (DST): UTC+3 (EEST)

Al-Haffah (Arabic: ٱلْحَفَّة, romanized: al-Ḥaffa) is a town in northwestern Syria, administratively part of the Latakia Governorate, located 33 kilometers (21 mi) east of Latakia. It is the center of al-Haffah District, one of the four districts (mantiqah) of the Latakia Goverorate. Al-Haffah's population was 4,298 in the 2004 census by the Central Bureau of Statistics (CBS) and the al-Haffah subdistrict (nahiya) had a population of 23,347. About 90% of the town's inhabitants are Sunni Muslims, while Christians constitute about 10% of the population. The communities have lived together in al-Haffah for centuries. The residents of al-Haffah are largely involved in agriculture. The town grows many types of fruits such as olives, figs, pomegranates, apples and pears.

== Geography and layout ==
Al-Haffah is surrounded by mountains and located 7 kilometers (4.3 mi) west of the Sahyun Castle (or Citadel of Salah al-Din), a UNESCO World Heritage Site.

The town is built on a narrow and forested ridgeline with an elevation of between 350 meters (1,150 ft) and 400 meters (1,300 ft) above sea level, overlooking the coastal plain of Latakia and the northern part of the Syrian Coastal Mountain Range. This positioning historically allowed it to dominate the surrounding countryside. Due to this placement and the surrounding terrain, the town has developed as a strip of built-up area along the Latakia–Slinfah road, surrounded by orchards. The homes and buildings, many two or three stories high, are clustered together with no open space in the town center.

== History ==
The Sahyun Castle was conquered by the Ayyubids in 1188. Although al-Haffah has been attested since the medieval period, it lacks archaeological remains, as building activity in its immediate vicinity from as early as Byzantine rule was concentrated in the formidable Sahyun Castle, which is located on a more defensible site. The local geographer Yaqut al-Hamawi mentioned al-Haffah in the early 13th century, during Ayyubid rule, noting that it was a district to the west of Aleppo comprising many villages and the producer of a fabric called Haffiyyah. The Sunni Muslim inhabitants of the Sahyun area generally descend from the Turkmen and Kurdish tribesmen settled in the mountain forts by the Mamluk sultan Baybars and his successors to better control the road between Aleppo and the coastal plain.

=== Ottoman period ===
In 1860 al-Haffah was visited by the American missionary R. J. Dodds of the Reformed Presbyterian Church. Dodds described it as "a beautiful village ... in a fertile and rather populous Muslim district, Sahyun". He noted that it had approximately 2,000 inhabitants, of whom most were Muslims and about 150 were Greek Orthodox Christians.

=== French Mandatory period ===
In 1919 al-Haffah was part of the uprising against the French occupation of Syria led by Umar al-Bitar in the Sahyun region, part of the wider Hananu Revolt across northwestern Syria, and in alliance with the Alawite Revolt led by Saleh al-Ali. Syria came under French Mandatory rule in 1923. In 1924, al-Haffah was promoted as the capital of the Sahyun mantiqah (district), which had formerly been the nearby town of Babanna. During this period, Sunni Muslims constituted 71% of the town's population, Christians 28% and Alawites 1%.

=== Post-Syrian independence ===
Through the 1950s, al-Haffah's influence extended north to Jabal al-Akrad, south to the Mahalibeh area and east to part of the Ghab Plain. In 1960, al-Haffah had a population of 2,750, of which 85% were Sunni Muslims and 15% were Christians. Although relatively small in size, it contained the typical characteristics of a city, namely government offices for religious and civil affairs and a gendarmerie battalion for policing the district. Further, it hosted the chief souk (market) of its mountainous district and its elites drew in the land rents of the surrounding countryside and dominated its trade network.

The Agrarian Reform Laws of the 1960s diminished the rent incomes of the town's landowning notables, the bulk of whom eventually relocated to Latakia, especially its Saliba neighborhood, or Damascus, though often keeping their homes in al-Haffah as summerhouses. The widening of the governorate capitals' power, in this case the Latakia Governorate, on the one hand, and the creation of new districts in the countryside in 1967–1970, in this case the Qardaha District, weakened the influence of al-Haffah which lost a significant part of its traditional hinterland (al-Haffah District lost the Fakhura area, about 20% of the district's territory, to Qardaha District as well as Shatha, which became part of the Hama Governorate). According to the anthropologist Fabrice Balanche, these factors explain the weak average annual population growth of 2% of al-Haffah between 1970 and 1981. Balanche also notes that the geography of the region, specifically the deep ravines which cut through east-west, hinders al-Haffah's potential, as many of its nahiya (subdistrict) towns, like Kinsabba, Muzayraa and Ayn al-Tineh, connect more easily with the city of Latakia, bypassing al-Haffah. Social differences also contribute to the weak commercial influence of al-Haffah on its district. Before the agrarian reforms, the Sunni notables of al-Haffah owned much of the mostly Alawite countryside villages, whose inhabitants were sharecroppers; while these villages benefited from the redistribution of the notables' lands, old resentments and persistent sectarian tensions deterred many Alawite villagers from visiting al-Haffah, except for administrative matters or visits to the weekly souk. By 1994 or 1997, the Christian proportion of the population had declined to 10%.

Al-Haffah's commercial influence is presently limited to the mostly Sunni Muslim villages in its immediate vicinity, and it is economically dependent on the city of Latakia, with which it has more socioeconomic ties than with the localities in its district.

=== Syrian civil war ===
During the Syrian civil war, on 5 June 2012, al-Haffah was captured by rebels from the Free Syrian Army, leading to eight days of heavy fighting and government shelling that ended when the rebels withdrew from the city. After government forces restored control over the city, UN observers reported severe damage in al-Haffah, with several homes, shops and government buildings, such as the post office, burnt and the hospital destroyed. The observers noted that the city appeared to have been deserted.

In early March 2025, the town of Al-Haffah in Syria's Latakia province became a focal point of intense violence during clashes between government forces and insurgents loyal to the ousted Assad regime. On March 7, 2025, reports indicate that seven civilians were executed in the Al-Haffah district by government defense and security forces. These events were part of a broader series of massacres targeting Alawite communities in the region, resulting in significant civilian casualties and escalating sectarian tensions. The violence in Al-Haffah and surrounding areas drew international condemnation, with organizations like the United Nations calling for immediate investigations into potential war crimes. The massacres led to significant internal displacement, as thousands of Alawite civilians fled their homes seeking safety.

== Bibliography ==
- Balanche, Fabrice (2000). "Les Alaouites, l'espace et le pouvoir dans la région côtière syrienne : une intégration nationale ambiguë" (in French). Tours: Université François Rabelais.
- Balanche, Fabrice (2006). La région alaouite et le pouvoir syrien (in French). Karthala Editions. ISBN 2845868189.
- Choueiri, Youssef M. (1993). State and society in Syria and Lebanon. University of Exeter Press. ISBN 085989410X.
- Dodds, R. J. (May 1860). "Missionary Correspondence". The Reformed Presbyterian. 24 (5): 137–144.
- Moosa, Matti (1987). Extremist Shiites: The Ghulat Sects. Syracuse University Press. ISBN 0-8156-2411-5.
- le Strange, Guy (1890). Palestine Under the Moslems: A Description of Syria and the Holy Land from A.D. 650 to 1500. Committee of the Palestine Exploration Fund.
