= Samer Qara Ali =

Syrian administrator and politician (born 1970)

- سامر قارا علي

Member of the People's Assembly
- Incumbent
- Assumed office 5 October 2025
- Constituency: Latakia

Personal details
- Born: Samer Duran Qara Ali; 1986 (age 39–40) Latakia, Syria
- Party: Independent
- Other political affiliations: Katibat Jabal al-Islam (2012–2025)

Samer Duran Qara Ali (Arabic: سامر دوران قره علي; born 1986) is a Syrian politician, engineer and former military officer who has served as a member of the People's Assembly for the constituency of Latakia since October 2025. Before entering parliament, he served as an officer in the Syrian Arab Army before defecting during the Syrian revolution and later becoming a founder of the opposition armed group Katibat Jabal al-Islam in Latakia Governorate.

== Early life and career ==
Qara Ali was born in the city of Latakia, Syria, in 1986. He studied engineering and later joined the Syrian Arab Army, where he attained the rank of First Lieutenant.

== Syrian Civil War ==
Following the outbreak of the Syrian revolution in 2011, Qara Ali defected from the Syrian military and joined the armed opposition against the Ba'athist regime of Bashar al-Assad. He subsequently became one of the founders of Katibat Jabal al-Islam, an opposition faction active in the mountainous regions of Latakia Governorate during the early years of the Syrian civil war. During the conflict, he became associated with opposition military and civil networks in north-western Syria.

== Election to parliament ==
Following the fall of the Assad regime in December 2024 and the subsequent political transition, Qara Ali entered public life as a political figure in Latakia Governorate. In the 2025 parliamentary election, Qara Ali was elected to the People's Assembly representing the constituency of Latakia.
