= Movement of Salah al-Din the Kurd =

Syrian kurdish islamist rebel militia

- Kurdish: بزووتنەوەى كورد سه‌لا‌حه‌دین; Arabic: حركة صلاح الدين الكردي; Turkish: Selahaddin Kurdi Hareketi
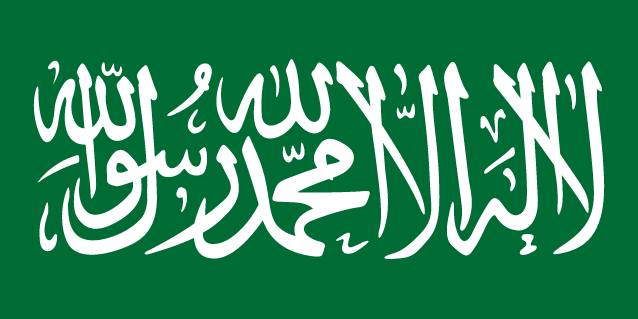
- Logo of the group Flag of the group
- Dates active: 2015 – 2026
- Active regions: Northern Syria
- Ideology: Kurdish Islamism; Salafi Islamism
- Wars: the Syrian Civil War

The Movement of Salah al-Din the Kurd (Kurdish: بزووتنەوەى كورد سه‌لا‌حه‌دین; Arabic: حركة صلاح الدين الكردي; Turkish: Selahaddin Kurdi Hareketi) is a Sunni Salafi Islamist militant rebel group of Kurdish fighters that takes part in the Syrian Civil War. Formed in 2015 by mostly Kurdish mujahideen from Syria, Turkey, Iran, and Iraq, the group mostly operates in northwestern Syria.

== History ==
The Movement of Salah al-Din the Kurd was founded by Kurdish militants who had been involved in the Syrian Civil War since 2012, many of whom had taken part in notable battles such as the Battle of Aleppo (2012–2016), Battle of Raqqa (March 2013), Battle of Idlib (2015), Northwestern Syria offensive (April–June 2015), and the battles for Latakia Governorate. On 21 September 2015, these veterans officially unified with the aim of ending the suppression of the Kurdish people and to return them to their perceived Islamic roots; on this basis, the Movement of Salah al-Din the Kurd takes inspiration from Jaban al-Kurdi, a Kurdish companion of Muhammad, and Saladin, founder of the Ayyubid dynasty. Following its foundation, the group specialised in sniper and infiltration tactics, while continuing to participate in combat operations in Latakia. By 2019, the group primarily operated in Jabal al-Akrad, and the al-Ghab Plain. It has fought alongside other rebel groups against the Syrian government's Northwestern Syria offensive from April 2019.

== Ideology ==
The militia espouses a Sunni Salafi Islamist ideology and attaches great value to the unity of the ummah (Islamic community). It consequently has implored the Syrian rebels to stay united in the face of the government. Members of the group have been taught by jihadist cleric Abdul Razzaq al-Mahdi.

The Movement of Salah al-Din the Kurd also regards itself as a Kurdish movement, and the protection of the rights of Kurds is one its main goals. The group has admitted that it is not supported by the majority of Kurds in Syria (who mainly back the secular Syrian Democratic Forces) and attributes this to its low profile. The militia has also voiced support for the Syrian opposition's civil councils, the spread of education (including non-Sharia education), and relief for orphans, widows, as well as IDPs.
