= Shatha =

Shatha or Chada (Arabic: shadha chada(in french) شذى - shortened written form, شذا - full-long written form), also spelt Shada, is an Arabic female given name meaning "scent, fragrant, aroma" (with a base note of fragrance notes). The name may also refer to the "perfume, scent of musk". Literally, it refers to the act of "the strength, intensity and scattering, diffusing smell by breaking the young oudh (agarwood) to be perfumed (on oneself) with it." Notable people with the name include:

== Given name ==
- Shatha Abdul Razzak Abbousi, Iraqi women's rights activist
- Shatha Hanaysha (born 1993), Palestinian journalist
- Shatha Hassoun (born 1981), Shada Hassoun, Iraqi female singer
- Shada Nasser (born 1964), Yemeni lawyer
- Shatha Mousa Sadiq, Iraqi politician
