= Kinsabba =

Town in northwestern Syria

Kinsabba كنسبا
- Town
- Kansaba
- Location in Syria
- Coordinates: 35°44′38″N 36°9′50″E
- Country: Syria
- Governorate: Latakia
- District: al-Haffah
- Subdistrict: Kinsabba

Population (2004)
  - Total: 514
- Time zone: UTC+2 (EET)
  - Summer (DST): UTC+3 (EEST)

Kinsabba (Arabic: كنسبا, also spelled Kansaba) is a town in northwestern Syria administratively belonging to the Latakia Governorate, located northeast of Latakia. Nearby localities include Slinfah to the south, al-Haffah to the southwest, Balloran and Umm al-Tuyour to the west, Qastal Ma'af to the northwest, al-Najiyah to the northeast, Qarqur to the east and Sirmaniyah to the southeast. According to the Syria Central Bureau of Statistics (CBS), Kinsabba had a population was 514 in 2004. It is the administrative center, but 16th largest locality, of the Kinsabba nahiyah ("subdistrict") which contains 35 localities with a collective population of 17,615. Its inhabitants were mostly Christians during the first half of the twentieth century, but it had become a predominantly Sunni Muslim village by 1994.

== History ==
The rebels attacked the Kinsabba police station on 25 May 2012 and seized the weapons. Later, they withdrew from the village. Syrian Arab Armed Forces captured the village from rebels on 18 February 2016. Several months later, the rebels recaptured the village from Assad forces on 1 July 2016. The regime forces seized the village on 9 August.

As of April 2025 the village is uninhabited. The police station was reopened on 17 September.

== Bibliography ==
- Balanche, Fabrice (2006). La région alaouite et le pouvoir syrien (in French). Karthala Editions. ISBN 2845868189.
