= Murshidism =

Religious movement

- 'Al-Murshidiyya
- Classification: Islam (Note: Referred to as such by Murshidis, though is stated as an entirely separate religious group by Sājī al-Murshid, the last official head of Murshidism.)
- Region: Levant
- Language: Arabic
- Founder: Salman al-Murshid
- Origin: 1920s Syria
- Separated from: Alawism; Shia Islam
- Members: approx. 300-500,000

Murshidism (Arabic: المرشدية, romanized: 'Al-Murshidiyya) is a religious movement (Note: As described by Sājī al-Murshid, the last official head of Murshidism, though still considered a branch of Islam by Murshidis.) formed as an offshoot of Alawism, itself also an offshoot of Shia Islam, with influences from Gnostic traditions. Its adherents, referred to as Murshidis, are estimated to number from 300,000 to 500,000 and are primarily concentrated in western Syria and Damascus.

== Etymology ==
The term Murshidiyya derives from the name of Salman al-Murshid, who founded the religion in the mid 20th century in Syria.

== Beliefs ==
Murshidis adhere to an extremely broad interpretation of Islam, considering each religion as Islam if they declare obedience to God.

Alongside this, Murshidi beliefs are also centered around metempsychosis and divides the human body into three aspects; the jasad (body), nafs (self) and rūḥ (soul); only rūḥ is considered part of the Divine Essence, and which will return to the spirit world (‘ālam al-arwāḥ) if through a righteous life. A rebirth within a new body will give the spirit rūḥ a new opportunity to get rid of the physical shell if it did not succeed in a previous life. As a result, Murshidis consider death as a release of the spirit and not as a reason of mourning. Usual Murshidi words of condolence are “Aḥsana Allāh ikhlāṣa-hu” (May Allah make good his salvation or his release).

Alongside this, Murshidis also believe in the idea of free will; according to Murshidi tradition, every person bears complete responsibility for his own deeds that are the results of his own will.

=== Theology and practices ===
==== Daily Muslim prayers (salah) ====
Unlike other branches of Islam, Murshidis only do two daily Muslim prayers (salah); one at sunrise and another at sunset, both of which are not obligatory.

==== Religious celebrations ====
The only Murshidi religious celebration is the Feast of Joy in God (Īd al-faraḥ bi-Llāh), celebrated every year from 25 August until 27 August. According to the beliefs of the present-day Murshidis, on August 25, Mujīb al-Murshid who is revered as a promised Messiah (al-qā’im al-maw’ūd) proclaimed the beginning of a “new religious message” (ad-da’wa al-jadīda), which according to Murshidis, serves as a new period in human history.

In addition to the Feast of Joy in God, Murshidis also celebrate occasions (munāsabāt) that are not considered as religious celebrations, but are occasions for celebration; the most important being the reunion of the Gassanide people (ittiḥād ash-sha’b al-ghassānī) on July 12, the celebration of Mujīb Murshid's release from prison on October 5, in addition to a night celebration, symbolizing gratitude to God on May 5.

== Differences between Murshidism and Alawism ==
Unlike Alawism, there are no sheikhs in Murshidism; instead, Murshidism is taught by mulaqqin (teachers), whom are elected from the Murshidi community and is responsible for educating young Murshidis in the religious doctrine of Murshidism. Alongside this, Murshidism also involves women in the learning of religious doctrine, unlike Alawism.
