= Al-Haffah District =

al-Haffa District منطقة الحفة
- District
- Map of al-Haffa District within Latakia Governorate
- Coordinates (al-Haffa): 35.58°N 36.03°E
- Country: Syria
- Governorate: Latakia
- Seat: al-Haffa
- Subdistricts: 5 nawāḥī

Area
  - Total: 569.81 km^{2} (220.00 sq mi)

Population (2004)
  - Total: 81,213
  - Density: 142.53/km^{2} (369.14/sq mi)
- Geocode: SY0603

Al-Haffah District (Arabic: منطقة الحفة, romanized: manṭiqat al-Ḥaffah) is a district of the Latakia Governorate in northwestern Syria. Administrative centre is the city of al-Haffah. At the 2004 census, the district had a population of 81,213.

Al-Haffah District is located in the area of An-Nusayriyah Mountains east of Lattakia city. It is an important trading centre where local farmers sell their apple fruits and other products. It has a significant historical importance as it was one of the main strategic points of the invading Crusaders. It is home to the Salah Ed-Din Castle; a UNESCO World Heritage Site.

With its Mediterranean fir forests and mild temperature in summer, the district is also one of the popular tourist destinations in Syria. Many mountainous resorts are located in the district, mainly in the town of Slinfah.

== Sub-districts ==
The district of al-Haffah is divided into five sub-districts or nawāḥī (population as of 2004):

- Al-Haffah Subdistrict (ناحية الحفة): population 23,347.
- Slinfah Subdistrict (ناحية صلنفة): population 19,518.
- Ayn al-Tineh Subdistrict (ناحية عين التينة): population 6,825.
- Kinsabba Subdistrict (ناحية كنسبّا): population 17,615.
- Muzayraa Subdistrict (ناحية مزيرعة): population 13,908.

== See also ==
- Kadin, Syria
- Latakia Governorate
- Jabal al-Akrad
- Murshidiyya
- Alawites
- Syrian Civil War
