= Fabrice Balanche =

French geographer (born 1969)

Fabrice Balanche (born November 3, 1969, in Belfort, France) is a French geographer and specialist in the political geography and geopolitics of Syria, Lebanon, Iraq and the wider Middle East.

== Biography ==
He completed his PhD under the supervision of Michaël F. Davie at the University of Tours in 2000 with a thesis on Les Alaouites, l'espace et le pouvoir dans la région côtière syrienne : une intégration nationale ambiguë. He spent about ten years in Lebanon and Syria. From 2005 to 2011 he worked as a consultant on the preservation of water resources in Syria for the Deutsche Gesellschaft für Internationale Zusammenarbeit.

He joined the academic staff of the Lumière University Lyon 2 in 2007 and achieved habilitation there in 2013. He worked as a researcher for the Washington Institute for Near East Policy from 2015 to 2017 and was a visiting researcher at Stanford University's Hoover Institution from 2017 to 2018. He co-directed an observatory of Syrian (2018–2021) and Levantine affairs (2023–2025) for the Ministry of Armed Forces's Direction Générale des Relations Internationales et de la Stratégie.

He was described by the Carnegie Endowment for International Peace as "one of the leading French experts on Syria". He is regularly quoted in the written press on the subject of Syria, in relation to his methods of mapping the Syrian civil war.

In April 2025, he was prevented from completing a lecture at Lyon 2 University by a group of pro-Palestinian activists, who branded him a "Zionist" and a "terrorist". Balanche claimed afterwards that the action was provoked by his denunciation on CNews of the campus protests against a ban on holding an iftar in a university hall on the previous day, and described the activists as "Islamo-leftists". A group called Lyon-2 Autonome claimed responsibility for the incident and stated that it wanted Balanche to stop teaching at the university due to his "unacceptable" stances on Palestine and Syria, in an apparent reference to his 2016 meeting with Bashar al-Assad in Syria in the company of The Popular Right leader Thierry Mariani and journalist André Bercoff. The Lyon public prosecutor's office opened an investigation for "obstructing the exercise of the teaching function." Balanche was placed under "functional protection."

== Publications ==
=== Books ===
- La région alaouite et le pouvoir syrien, Paris: Karthala, 2006, ISBN 978-2-84586-818-2.
- Atlas du Proche-Orient Arabe, Paris: Sorbonne University Press and RFI, 2012, ISBN 978-284-050-7970.
  - English trans. as Atlas of the Near East: State Formation and the Arab-Israeli Conflict, 1918–2010, Leiden: Brill, 2017, ISBN 978-90-04-34429-7.
- Géopolitique du Moyen-Orient (Documentation photographique, no. 8102), Paris: Documentation française, 2014.
- Sectarianism in Syria's Civil War: A Geopolitical Study Featuring 70 Original Maps, Washington, DC: Washington Institute for Near East Policy, 2018.
- Syrie Liban : communautarisme et pouvoir, Hunningues: Presses Universitaires de Rhin et Danube, 2022.
- Les leçons de la crise syrienne, Paris: Odile Jacob, 2024.

=== Edited journal issue ===
- Le Liban et la crise syrienne, Maghreb-Machrek 218.4 (2013), ISBN 9782747222983.
