= Slinfah =

Town in northwestern Syria

Slinfah صلنفة
- Town
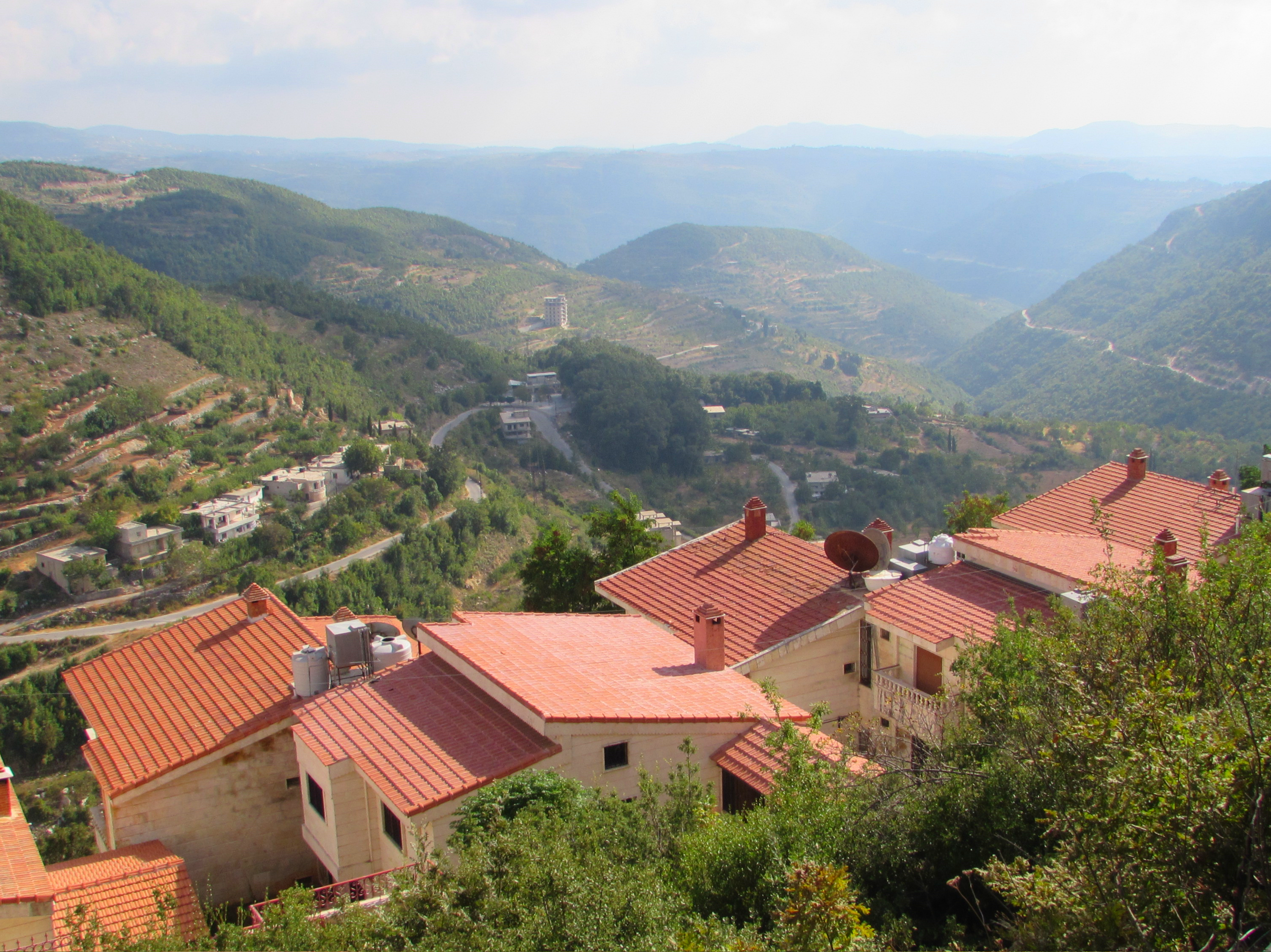

- Location in Syria
- Coordinates: 35°36′1″N 36°10′43″E
- Country: Syria
- Governorate: Latakia
- District: al-Haffah
- Subdistrict: Slinfah
- Elevation: 1,130 m (3,710 ft)

Population (2004 census)
  - Town: 1,847
  - Metro: 19,518
- Time zone: UTC+2 (EET)
  - Summer (DST): UTC+3 (EEST)
- Climate: Csb

Slinfah (Arabic: صلنفة, romanized: Ṣalinfah, Ṣlenfah) is a Syrian town-resort, founded in 1929, administratively belonging to Al-Haffah District within the Latakia Governorate. It is located at an average height of 1130 metres above sea level on the An-Nusayriyah Mountains, 50 km east of Latakia city. According to the 2004 official census, the town's population is 1,847, reaching up to 19,518 inhabitants with the 25 surrounding villages in the Slinfah subdistrict (nahiyah).

With its mild summer temperature, Slinfah is a popular destination for Syrians. The town is characterised with severe cold temperature and heavy snow in winter. Slinfah is inhabited by Sunnis, Syrian Orthodox Christians, and Alawites.

The historical Citadel of Salah Ed-Din is only 13 km west of Slinfah.

== Geography ==
The town is located 50 km east of Latakia, and is located in the heart of the Coastal Mountains of Syria, with the town reaching an elevation of 1130 meters. Slinfah's highest point is the peak of the Prophet Yunis which has a height of 1300 metres above sea level. The nearby Shooh mountains are covered with 500 hectares of fir trees.

=== Climate ===
Slinfah in winter

In Slinfah, the climate is warm and temperate. In winter there is much more rainfall in Slinfah than in summer. According to Köppen and Geiger climate is classified as Csb. The average annual temperature in Slinfah is 12.8 °C (55.0 °F). About 1,282 mm (50.5 in) of precipitation falls annually.

Climate data for Slinfah, 1961-1990 elevation 1,100 m (3,600 ft)
Month	Jan	Feb	Mar	Apr	May	Jun	Jul	Aug	Sep	Oct	Nov	Dec	Year
Mean daily maximum °C (°F)	6.5 (43.7)	7.3 (45.1)	10.6 (51.1)	15.0 (59.0)	19.2 (66.6)	22.5 (72.5)	24.0 (75.2)	25.2 (77.4)	23.2 (73.8)	19.6 (67.3)	14.6 (58.3)	9.3 (48.7)	16.4 (61.6)
Daily mean °C (°F)	4.0 (39.2)	4.4 (39.9)	7.3 (45.1)	11.1 (52.0)	15.1 (59.2)	18.2 (64.8)	20.0 (68.0)	21.1 (70.0)	18.8 (65.8)	15.8 (60.4)	11.5 (52.7)	6.0 (42.8)	12.8 (55.0)
Mean daily minimum °C (°F)	1.6 (34.9)	1.5 (34.7)	4.0 (39.2)	7.4 (45.3)	10.8 (51.4)	14.1 (57.4)	16.0 (60.8)	16.8 (62.2)	14.6 (58.3)	12.0 (53.6)	8.1 (46.6)	2.7 (36.9)	9.1 (48.4)
Average precipitation mm (inches)	220 (8.7)	207 (8.1)	231 (9.1)	128 (5.0)	56 (2.2)	27 (1.1)	8 (0.3)	7 (0.3)	34 (1.3)	67 (2.6)	105 (4.1)	273 (10.7)	1,363 (53.5)
Source: FAO

== Gallery ==
Slinfah in winter

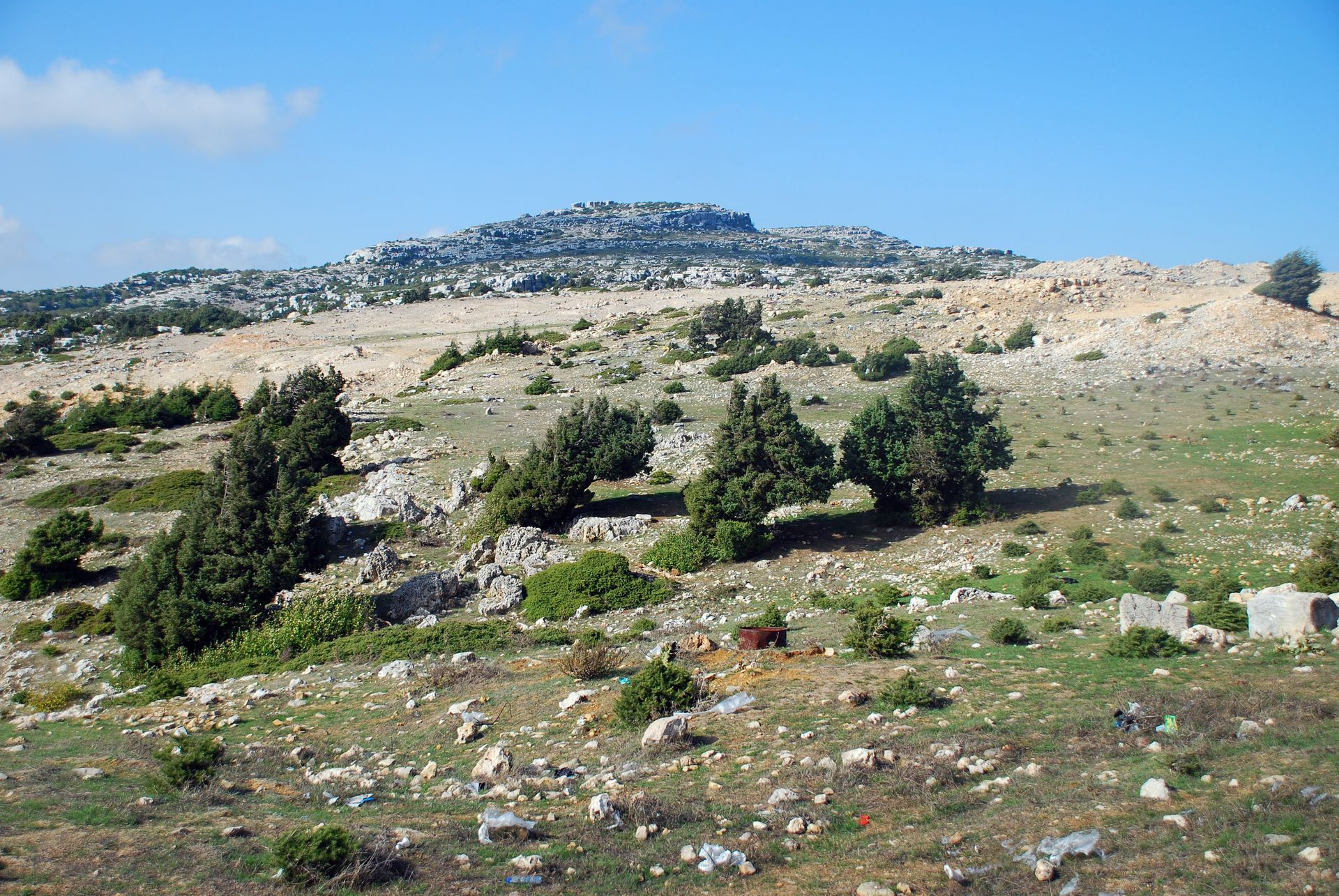
Jebel Aansariye

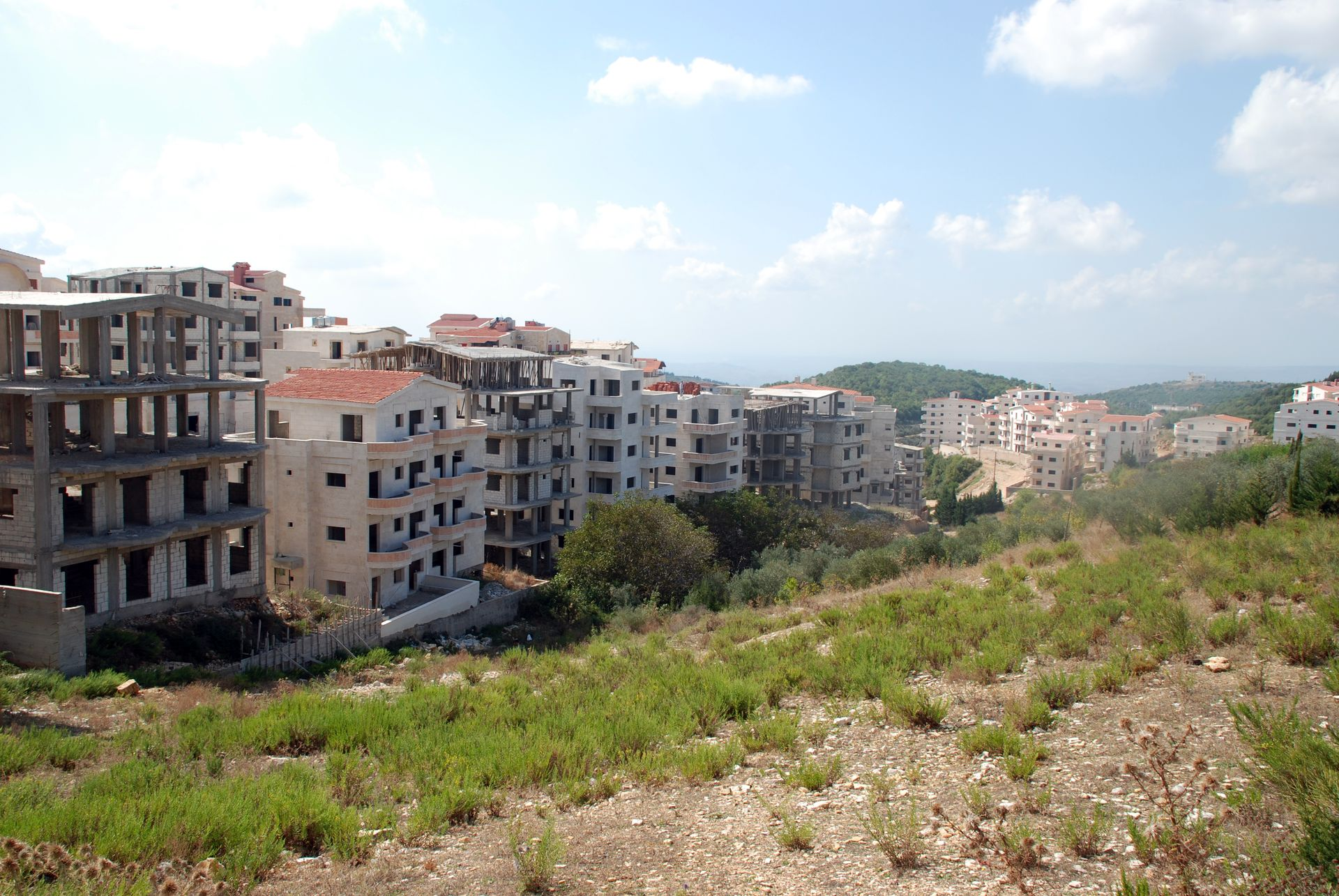
The town
