= Latakia Governorate =

Latakia Governorate مُحافظة اللاذقية
- Governorate
- Lattakia Governorate
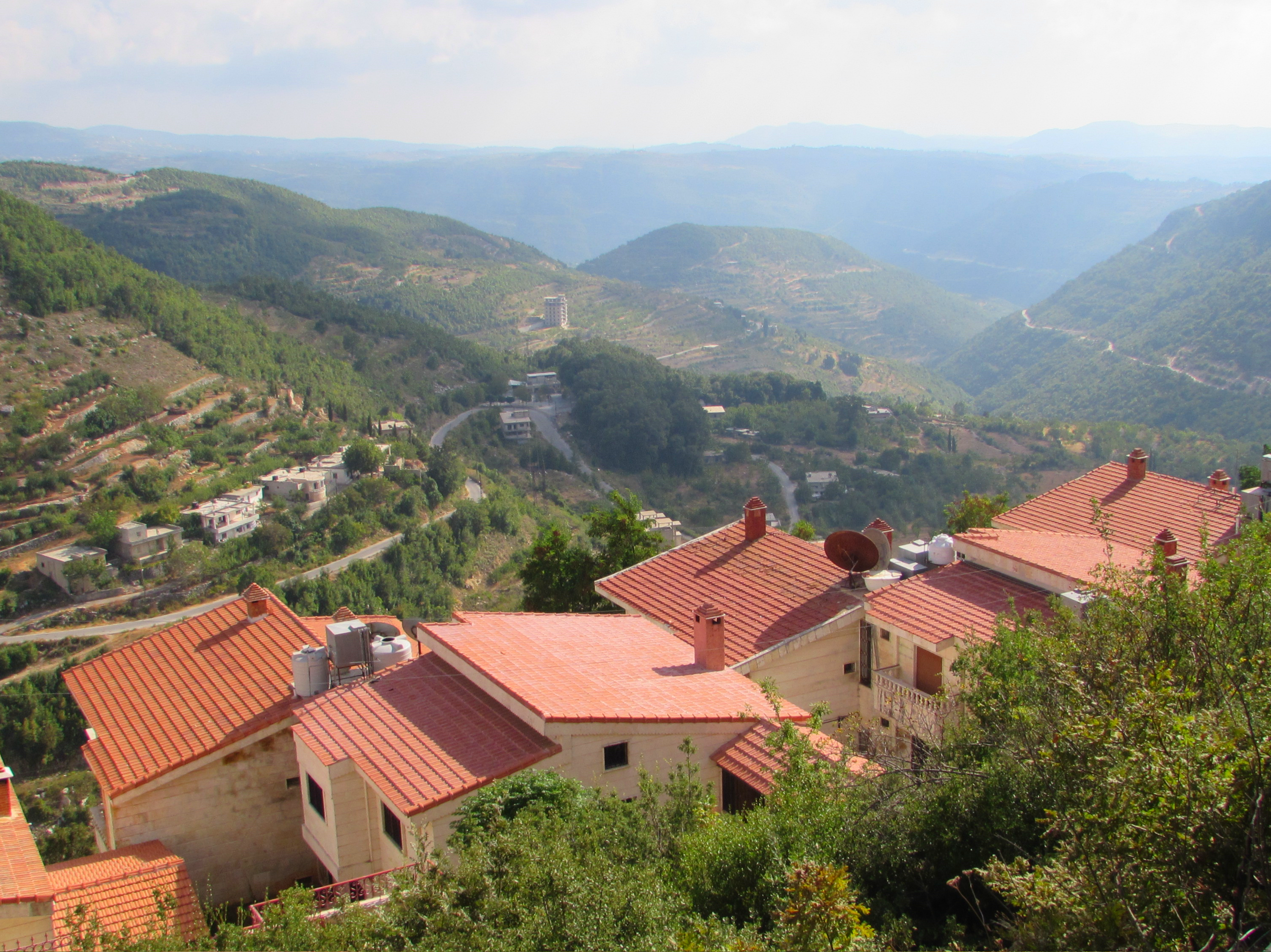
- Slinfah, one of Syria's most famed resorts in the Syrian Coastal Mountains

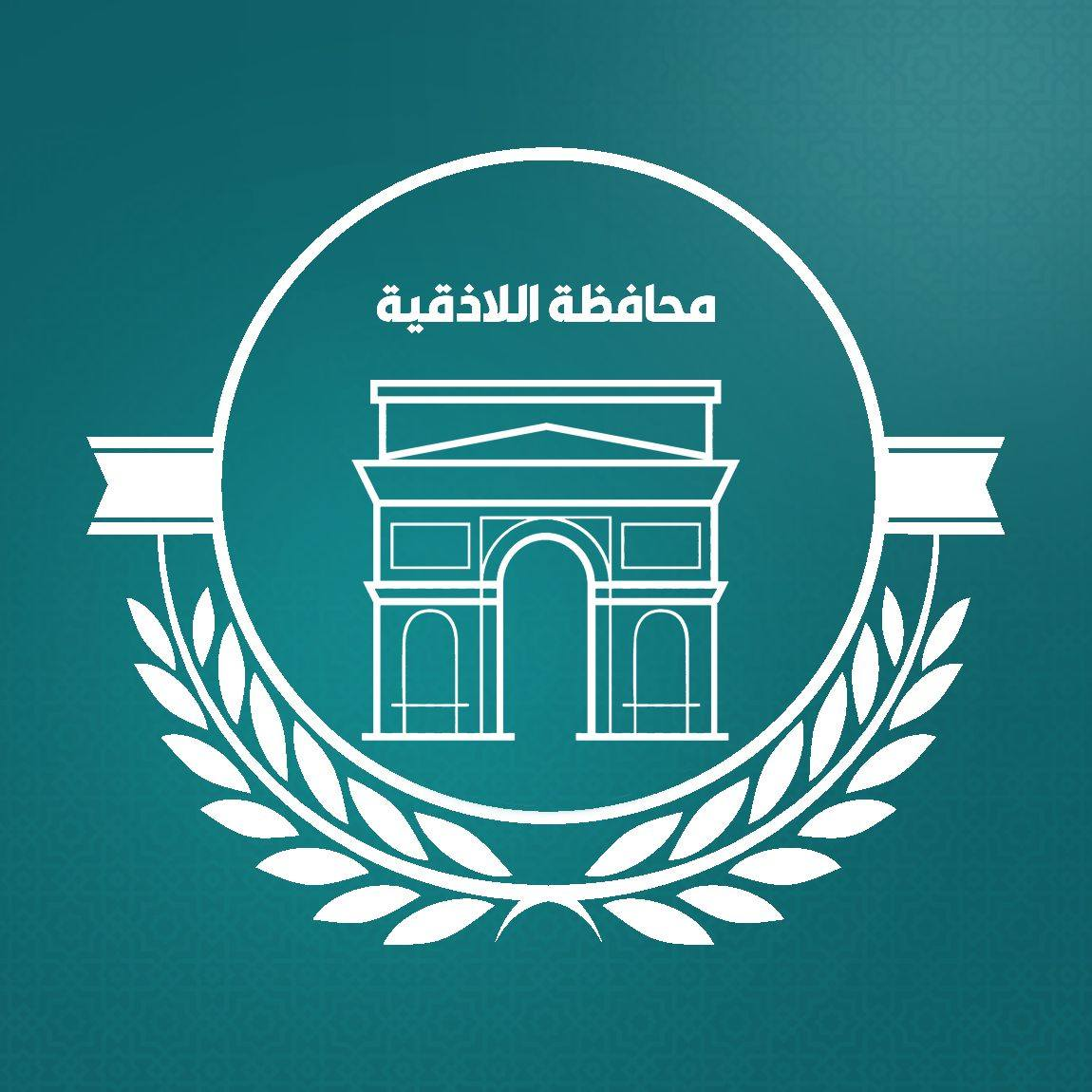
- Seal

- Map of Syria with Latakia highlighted
- Interactive map of Latakia Governorate
- Coordinates (Latakia): 35.6°N 36°E
- Country: Syria
- Capital: Latakia
- Manatiq (Districts): 4

Government
  - Governor: Ahmad Ali Mustafa

Area
  - Total: 2,297 km^{2} (887 sq mi)
- Estimates range between 2,297 km^{2} and 2,437 km^{2}

Population (2011)
  - Total: 1,008,000
  - Density: 438.8/km^{2} (1,137/sq mi)
- Time zone: UTC+3 (AST)
- ISO 3166 code: SY-LA
- Website: latakia.gov.sy

Latakia Governorate (Arabic: مُحافظة اللاذقية, romanized: Muḥāfaẓat al-Lāḏiqiyya), officially known as Lattakia Governorate, is one of the fourteen governorates of Syria. It is situated in northwestern Syria, bordering Turkey's Hatay Province to the north, Idlib and Hama Governorate to the east, Tartus Governorate to the south, and the Mediterranean Sea to the west. Its reported area varies in different sources from 2,297 km^{2} (887 sq mi) to 2,437 km^{2} (941 sq mi). The governorate has a population of 1,008,000 (2011 estimate).

== History ==
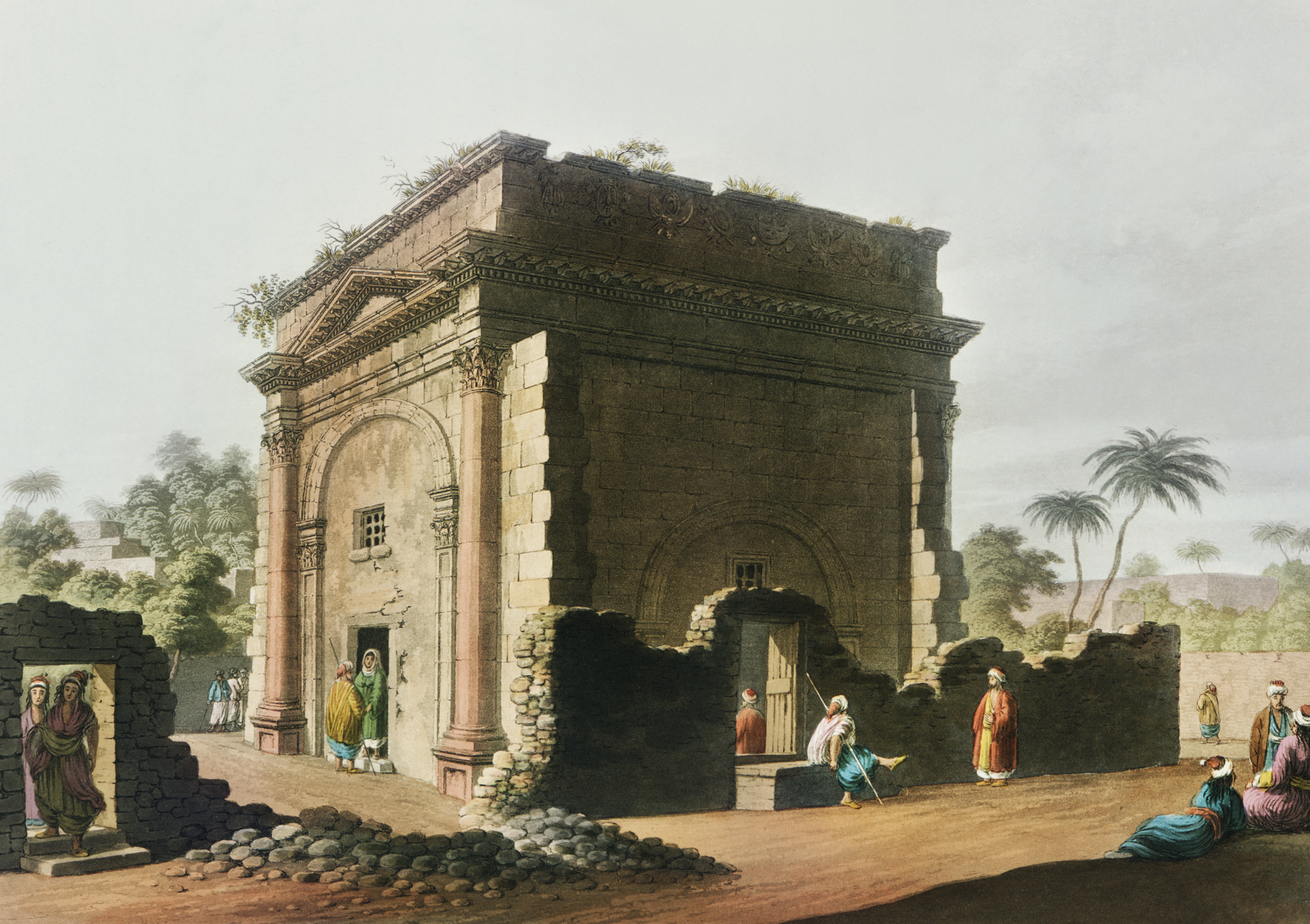
Triumphal Arch of Septimius Severus in Latakia, from an 1810 illustration by Luigi Mayer

The governorate was historically part of the Alawite State, which existed from 1920 to 1936.

Tartus Governorate was formerly included as part of Latakia, before being split off circa 1972.

The region has been relatively peaceful during the Syrian civil war, being a generally pro-Assad region that had largely remained under government control. The Free Syrian Army attacked Al-Haffah in 2012, and unsuccessfully attempted to wrest control of the province in 2014, 2015 and 2016. In 2016 the Islamic State conducted a bomb attack on Jableh, resulting in many deaths.

On 8 March 2025, the UK-based SOHR reported that Syrian security forces and pro-government fighters had committed a massacre of more than 750 Alawite civilians during clashes in western Syria.

In January 2026, the Latakia Governorate issued a decree prohibiting female public sector employees from wearing make-up during official work hours. However, the governorate clarified that it "aims to regulate professional workplace appearance, not prohibit - by avoiding excessive use of cosmetics."

=== Archaeological sites ===
- Citadel of Salah Ed-Din - Ayyubid castle
- Paltus - Phoenician city
- Ugarit - Bronze Age site

== Geography ==
The Latakia Governorate comprises about half of Syria's Mediterranean coastline. The western part of the governorate consists mainly of coastal plains, with the inland eastern parts being mountainous, with the Syrian Coastal Mountain Range (Nusayriyah Mountains) running north to south. Its highest peak, Nabi Yunis, is 1,562 meters (5,125 ft) tall with the average elevation only about 1,200 meters. The western areas of the governorate catch moisture-laden winds from the Mediterranean Sea and are thus more fertile and more heavily populated than the eastern slopes.

The Orontes River flows north alongside the range on its eastern verge in the Al-Ghab Plain, a 64 kilometres (40 mi) longitudinal trench, and then around the northern edge of the range to flow into the Mediterranean. Another important river is Nahr al-Kabir al-Shamali, a river running from the Turkish border and to the southwest to flow in the Mediterranean, with the 16 Tishreen dam, one of the most important in the region, being constructed for power generation, storage of rain and river water, and the creation of Mashqita Lake.

=== Cities ===
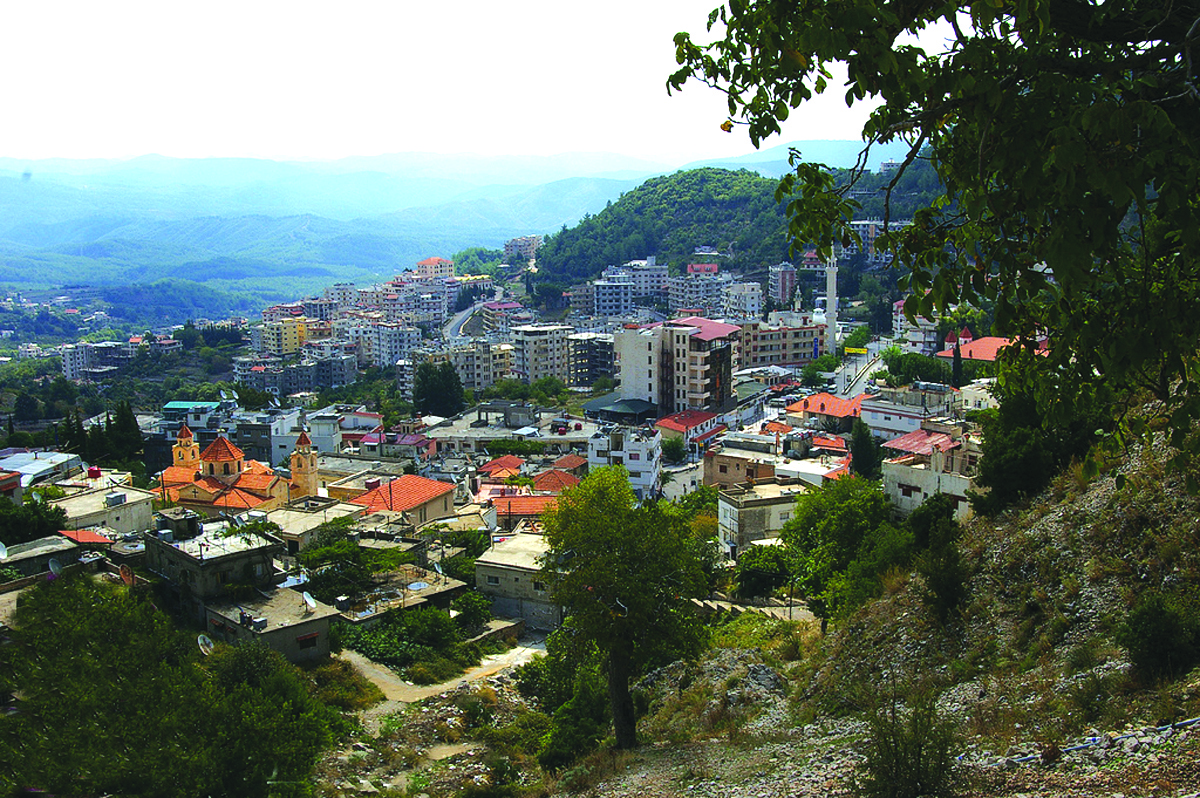
The town of Kessab

Latakia is the regional capital; other major settlements include Al-Haffah, Ibn Hani, Jableh, Kessab, Manjila, Qaranjah, Qardaha and Salma.

The following cities are the administrative centres of the districts in Latakia Governorate (Population based on 2004 official census):

City	Population
Latakia	383,786
Jableh	80,000
Qardaha	8,671
Al-Haffah	4,298

=== Districts ===

The governorate is divided into four districts (manatiq). The districts are further divided into 22 sub-districts (nawahi):

- Latakia District (7 sub-districts)
  - Latakia Subdistrict
  - Al-Bahluliyah Subdistrict
  - Rabia Subdistrict
  - Ayn al-Baydah Subdistrict
  - Qastal Ma'af Subdistrict
  - Kessab Subdistrict
  - Hanadi Subdistrict
- Al-Haffah District (5 sub-districts)
  - Al-Haffah Subdistrict
  - Slinfah Subdistrict
  - Ayn al-Tineh Subdistrict
  - Kinsabba Subdistrict
  - Muzayraa Subdistrict
- Jableh District (6 sub-districts)
  - Jableh Subdistrict
  - Ayn al-Sharqiyah Subdistrict
  - Al-Qutailibiyah Subdistrict
  - Ayn Shiqaq Subdistrict
  - Daliyah Subdistrict
  - Beit Yashout Subdistrict
- Qardaha District (4 sub-districts)
  - Qardaha Subdistrict
  - Harf al-Musaytirah Subdistrict
  - Al-Fakhurah Subdistrict
  - Jawbat Burghal Subdistrict

=== Climate ===
Climate data for Latakia (1961–1990, extremes 1928–present)
Month	Jan	Feb	Mar	Apr	May	Jun	Jul	Aug	Sep	Oct	Nov	Dec	Year
Record high °C (°F)	24.4 (75.9)	26.3 (79.3)	32.6 (90.7)	35.6 (96.1)	38.8 (101.8)	38.4 (101.1)	36.2 (97.2)	38.4 (101.1)	38.2 (100.8)	39.0 (102.2)	32.6 (90.7)	28.0 (82.4)	39.0 (102.2)
Mean daily maximum °C (°F)	15.4 (59.7)	16.4 (61.5)	18.3 (64.9)	21.5 (70.7)	24.1 (75.4)	25.8 (78.4)	28.8 (83.8)	29.6 (85.3)	29.0 (84.2)	26.3 (79.3)	21.9 (71.4)	17.6 (63.7)	22.9 (73.2)
Daily mean °C (°F)	11.6 (52.9)	12.6 (54.7)	14.8 (58.6)	17.8 (64.0)	20.7 (69.3)	23.8 (74.8)	26.3 (79.3)	27.0 (80.6)	25.6 (78.1)	22.3 (72.1)	17.5 (63.5)	13.3 (55.9)	19.4 (66.9)
Mean daily minimum °C (°F)	8.4 (47.1)	9.1 (48.4)	11.0 (51.8)	14.0 (57.2)	17.0 (62.6)	20.7 (69.3)	23.7 (74.7)	24.3 (75.7)	21.9 (71.4)	18.2 (64.8)	13.8 (56.8)	10.1 (50.2)	16.0 (60.8)
Record low °C (°F)	−1.6 (29.1)	−0.5 (31.1)	−0.6 (30.9)	3.9 (39.0)	10.6 (51.1)	11.7 (53.1)	17.8 (64.0)	17.2 (63.0)	12.4 (54.3)	8.9 (48.0)	0.0 (32.0)	0.0 (32.0)	−1.6 (29.1)
Average precipitation mm (inches)	185.2 (7.29)	97.0 (3.82)	91.5 (3.60)	48.5 (1.91)	22.4 (0.88)	5.2 (0.20)	1.3 (0.05)	2.3 (0.09)	8.0 (0.31)	69.3 (2.73)	95.5 (3.76)	185.2 (7.29)	811.4 (31.94)
Average precipitation days (≥ 1.0 mm)	11.3	9.3	8.4	4.6	2.7	1.0	0.3	0.3	1.0	5.2	6.6	11.0	61.7
Average relative humidity (%)	63	62	65	68	72	74	74	73	68	62	57	65	67
Mean monthly sunshine hours	136.4	148.4	198.4	225.0	297.6	321.0	325.5	316.2	288.0	248.0	192.0	151.9	2,848.4
Mean daily sunshine hours	4.4	5.3	6.4	7.5	9.6	10.7	10.5	10.2	9.6	8.0	6.4	4.9	7.8
Source 1: NOAA
Source 2: Deutscher Wetterdienst (humidity, 1966–1978), Meteo Climat (record highs and lows)

== Economy ==
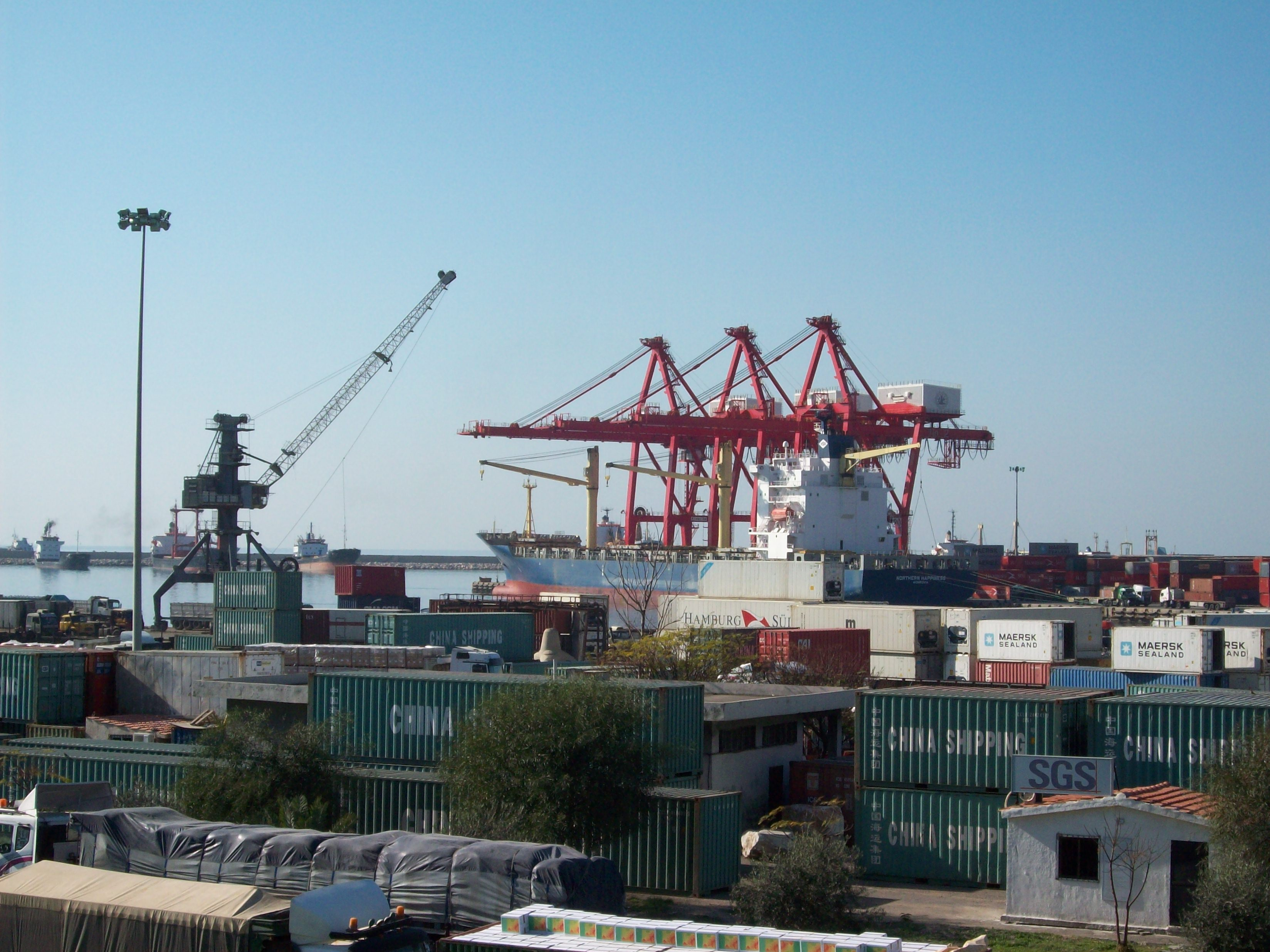
The Port of Latakia, Syria's main seaport

The governorate is located on the Mediterranean Sea, which gave it great economic importance, with the capital of the governorate, Latakia serving as Syria's main port. Its port was established on 12 February 1950.

Its imported cargo includes clothing, construction materials, vehicles, furniture, minerals, tobacco, cotton, and food supplies such as lintels, onions, wheat, barley, dates, grains and figs; in 2008, the port handled about 8 million tons of cargo.

The governorate is also a popular domestic tourist destination, with the Cote d'Azur B=beach of Latakia being Syria's premier coastal resort, offering water skiing, jet skiing, and windsurfing. The city contains eight hotels, two of which have five-star ratings; both the Cote d'Azur de Cham Hotel and Lé Meridien Lattiquie Hotel are located 6 kilometres (3.7 mi) north of the city, at Cote d'Azur. The latter hotel has 274 rooms and is the only international hotel in the city. Latakia is also host to numerous designer-label stores, notably on 8 Azar Street, and the heart of the city's shopping area is the series of blocks enclosed by 8 Azar Street, Yarmouk Street, and Saad Zaghloul Street in the city centre. Cinemas in Latakia include Ugarit Cinema, al-Kindi, and a smaller theater off al-Moutanabbi Street.

== Demographics ==
Religious composition of Latakia Governorate (2011)
Alawites	58%
Sunnis	37%
Christians	5%
Shias	0.2%
Ismailis	0.2%

As per the 2004 Syrian census the population was 879,550. A 2011 UNOCHA estimate put the population at 1,008,000, though this has likely changed since the start of the war.

At the end of 2021, Latakia's population reached 1,634,000, accounting for 6% of Syria's total population. The majority at 68% are Alawite Muslims, followed by 17% Sunni Muslims, 15% Christians, 0.2% Twelver Shia Muslims and 0.2% Ismaili Muslims.

=== Languages ===
The primary languages of the province are Arabic, Armenian and Turkish (Syrian Turkmen dialects). Arabic is spoken in all district centres of the governorate and most, if not all towns and villages surrounding them, with the North Levantine dialect mostly used. An exception is Kessab, a historically Armenian-populated town where Armenian is the primary language in it and the surrounding villages such as Sev Aghpyur, Esguran and Duzaghaj, and the Turkmen Mountain where Turcoman is spoken primarily, though many Turkmen have fled the area since the start of the civil war.

== Gallery ==
Map of Latakia governorate

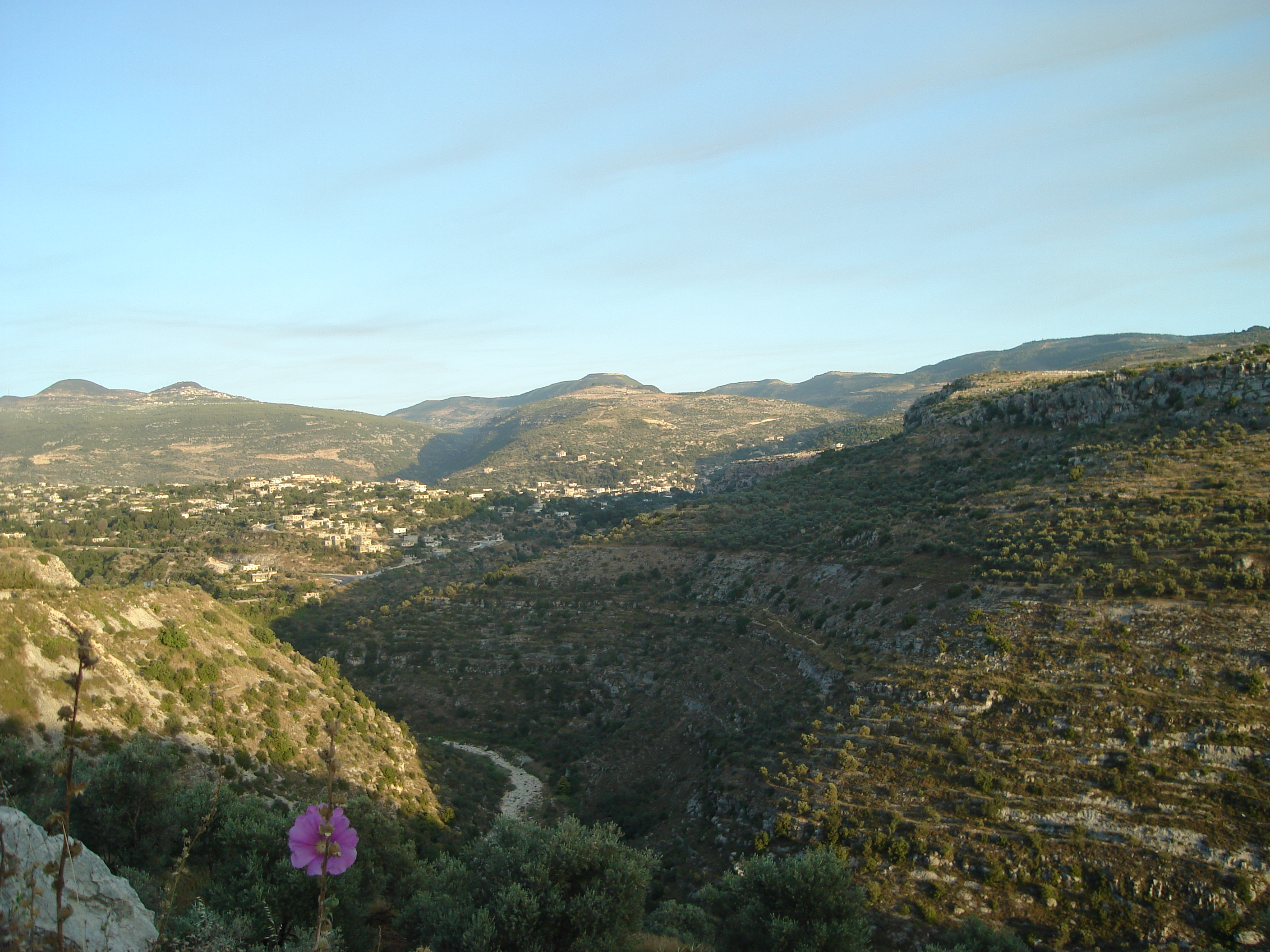
Mountains near Beit Yashout

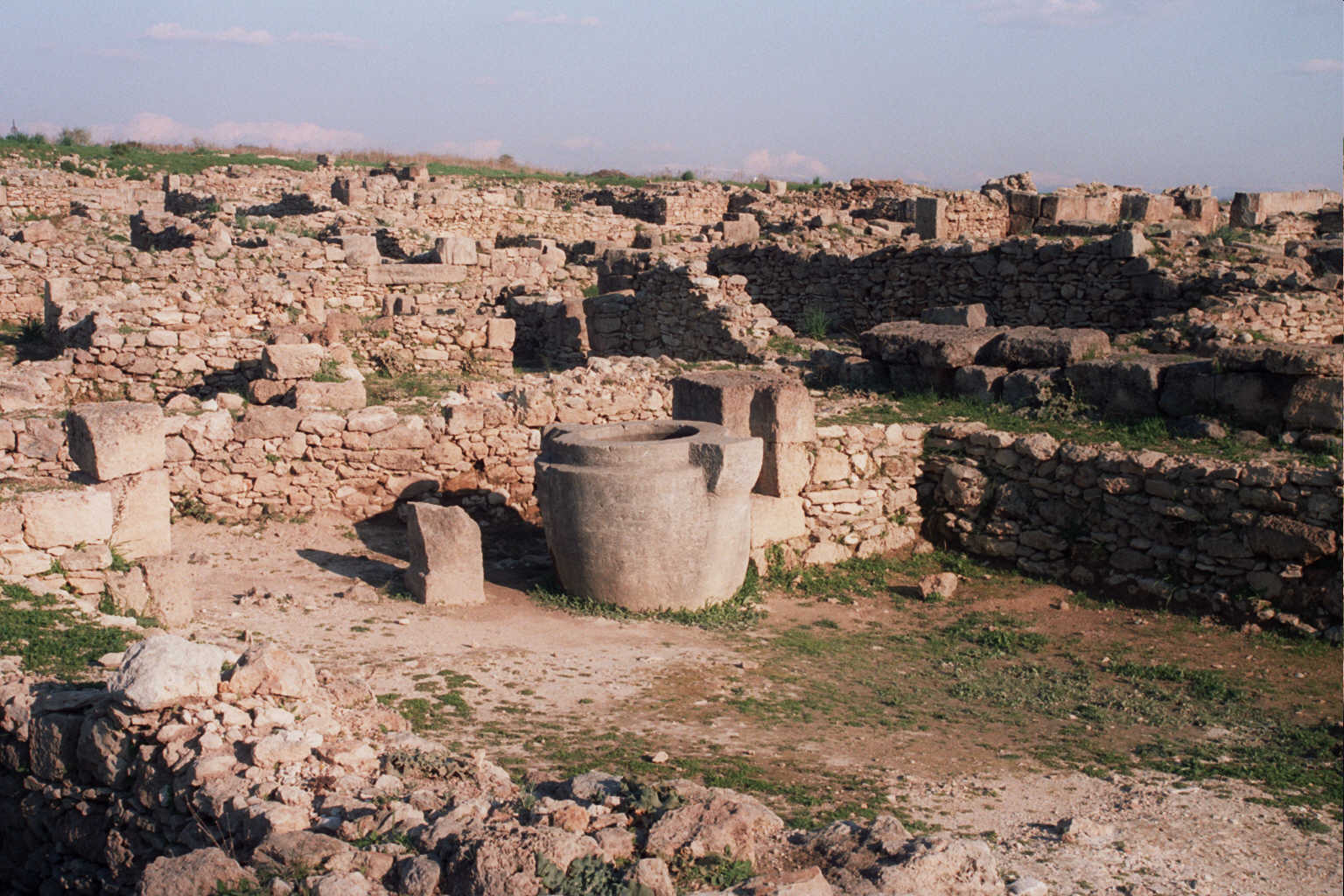
Ruins of Ugarit

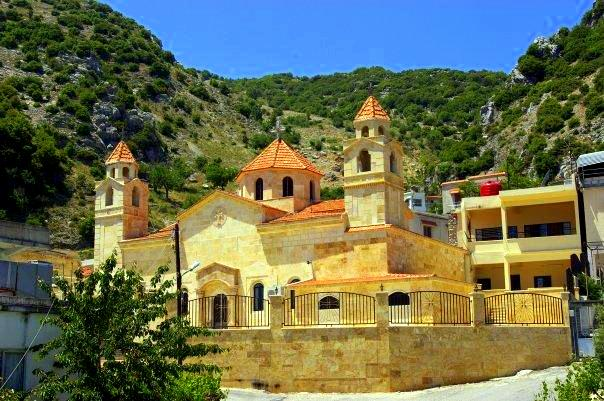
Armenian church in Kessab

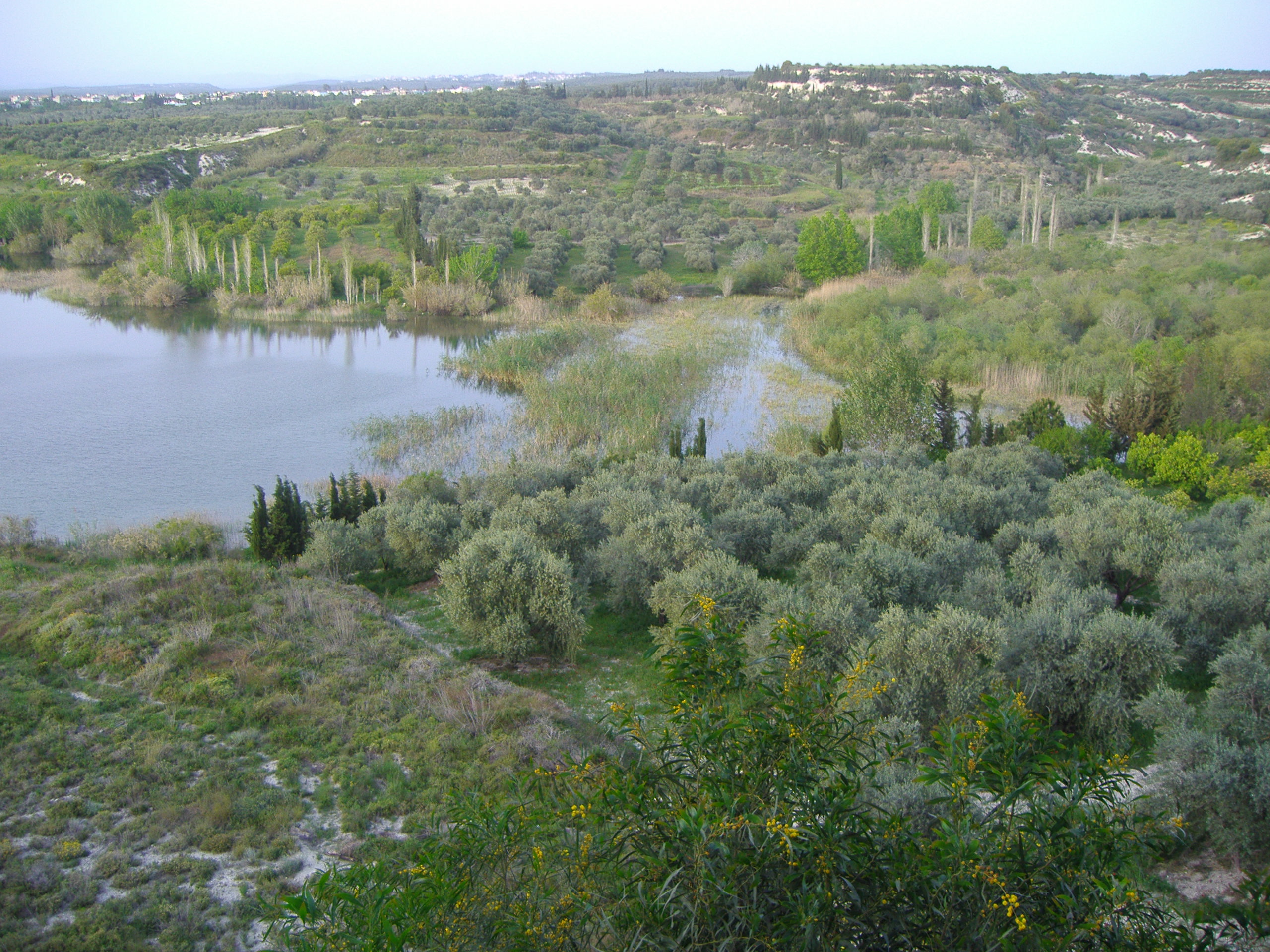
Countryside near Mushayrafet al-Samouk

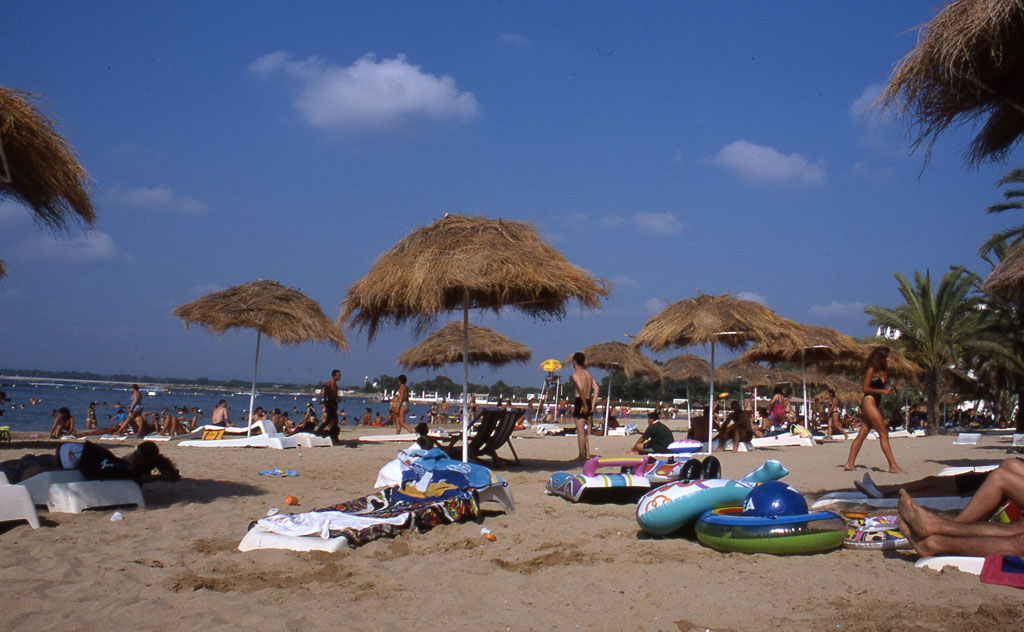
Sunbathers on the Latakian Cote d'Azur

== See also ==
- Alawite State
- Kadin, Syria
- Latakia tobacco
