= Al-Qutailibiyah =

Town in northwestern Syria

Al-Qutailibiyah القطيلبية Kotailabiyeh
- Town
- Location within Syria
- Coordinates: 35°17′20″N 36°0′55″E
- Country: Syria
- Governorate: Latakia
- District: Jableh
- Subdistrict: al-Qutailibiyah

Population (2004)
  - Total: 5,566
- Time zone: UTC+2 (EET)
  - Summer (DST): UTC+3 (EEST)

Al-Qutailibiyah (Arabic: القطيلبية, also spelled Kotailabiyah or Qutelbyeh) is a town in northwestern Syria, administratively part of the Jableh District in the Latakia Governorate, located south of Latakia. Nearby localities include Arab al-Mulk and Qurfays and Sarabion to the west, Jableh to the northwest, Siyano to the north, Ayn al-Sharqiyah to the northeast, Daliyah to the southeast and Dweir Baabda to the south. According to the Syria Central Bureau of Statistics, al-Qutailibiyah had a population of 5,566 in the 2004 census. It is the administrative center of the al-Qutailibiyah nahiyah ("subdistrict") which contained 32 localities with a total population of 32,582 in 2004. Its inhabitants are predominantly Alawites from the Bani Ali (part of the Haddadin tribal confederation) and the Kharalis Ghuraba (part of the Kalbiyya confederation) clans.

Many of al-Qutailibiyah's residents have connections with the country's security establishment, particularly in relation to Ali Douba, and a number of al-Qutailibiyah's businesses, especially wholesalers who sell their products to businesses in the vicinity of the al-Ghab plain, have benefited from these ties substantially.
