= Sarabion =

- سربيون
- Country: Syria
- Governorate: Latakia
- District: Jableh

Population
  - Total: 4,000

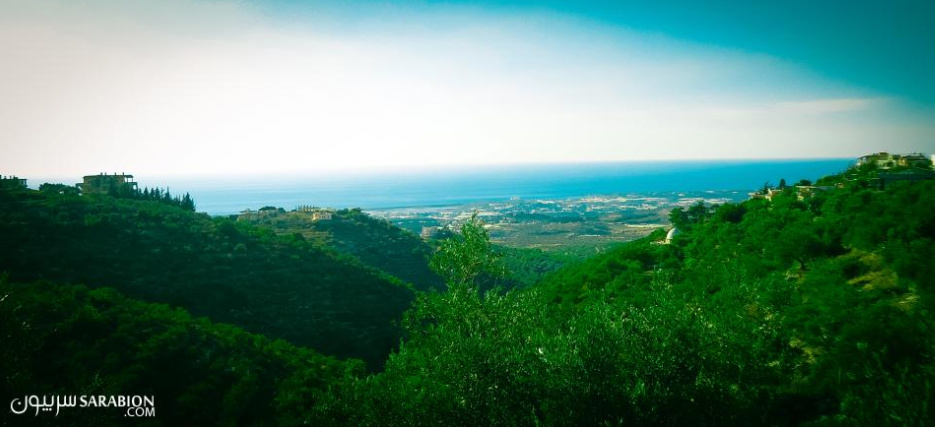
View of the sea by the village (Source: http://sarabion.com)

Sarabion

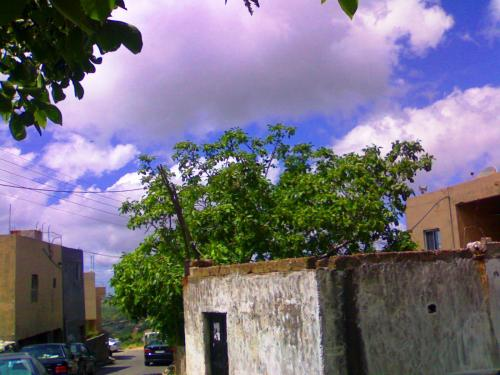
AlHara AlTahtaniah

Sarabion, also written as Srabion or Sarabioun (Arabic: سربيون) is a village belonging to the city of Jableh, located in the mountains of the Syrian coast, administratively affiliated to Al-Qutailibiyah circle and it is part the municipality of Dweir Baabda. The village is one of the oldest inhabited villages in the Syrian coast.

== Geography ==
The village is at about 500 metres (1,600 ft) above sea level. Neighboring villages include Harisoun, Qurfays, and Dweir Baabda.

The area has a Mediterranean climate, with high humidity in summer and heavy rain in winter.

== Demography ==
Important figures from the village include Sheikh Abdullah Al-Sarbouni.

Family names in the village include Ismael, Mohammad, Saleh, Ali, Skeif, Wannous, Masoud, Khalil, Abdulkarim, Darweesh, Mhanna, Safi, Aziz, Hashem, Asaad, Saada, Mahmoud, Eskandar, and others.

== Neighborhoods ==
Al Hara, Al Hara Al Fouqanyah, Al Hara Al Tehtanyah, Karm Elrejmeh, Al Rabaá, Haret Al Sheikh, AL Kzaiber, Harf Al Aswad, Naghbeen, Al Dawara. (Sarabion.com)

The village's residents work mainly in agriculture. The most important crops in the village are olives, tobacco and wheat. Most of the village's residents own real estate and agricultural lands in the neighboring villages (Harisoun, Muhurta, Ras al-Wata, Bashnana)
