= Al-Budi =

Al-Budi البودي El-Bodi
- Village
- Location within Syria
- Coordinates: 35°23′45″N 36°5′14″E
- Country: Syria
- Governorate: Latakia
- District: Jableh
- Subdistrict: Ayn al-Shiqaq

Population (2004)
  - Total: 2,359
- Time zone: UTC+2 (EET)
  - Summer (DST): UTC+3 (EEST)

Al-Budi (Arabic: البودي, also spelled el-Bodi) is a village in northwestern Syria, administratively part of the Jableh District in the Latakia Governorate, located south of Latakia. Nearby localities include Ayn al-Shiqaq to the west, Qardaha to the north, Harf al-Musaytirah to the east, Zama and Ayn al-Sharqiyah to the south and Siyano to the southwest. According to the Syria Central Bureau of Statistics, al-Budi had a population of 2,359 in the 2004 census. The inhabitants are predominantly Alawites.
