= Ayn Salem =

Ain Salem عين سالم
- Hamlet
- ʿAyn Salem
- Location within Syria
- Coordinates: 35°18′50″N 36°4′55″E
- Country: Syria
- Governorate: Latakia
- District: Jableh
- Subdistrict: Ayn al-Sharqiyah

Population (2004)
  - Total: 177
- Time zone: UTC+2 (EET)
  - Summer (DST): UTC+3 (EEST)

Ayn Salem (Arabic: عين سالم, romanized: ʿAyn Salem, also spelled Ain Salem) is a hamlet in northwestern Syria, administratively part of Beit Yashout Subdistrict in the Jableh District in the Latakia Governorate, located southeast of Latakia. According to the 2004 census, the locality had a population of 177.

== History ==
The Byzantine church of Ain Salem was found during excavations between 2009 and 2013. The church dated to the late antiquity, but survived into the early Abbasid period. The church followed the general architectural tradition of the Christian churches of the coast of Syria, but had an unusual three-projecting-apse eastern end, suggesting Cypriot architectural influence. The church contained substantial mosaic pavements. Their decorations and techniques belonged to the local tradition, while incorporating motifs known from the major Syrian centers of Antioch and Apamea. There was also evidence of significant repairs being done after an earthquake, suggesting the church was still in use considerably after the date of its original construction into the Abbasid period.

== See also ==
- Beit Yashout
- Jableh
- Tell Tweini
