= Al-Qassabin =

Al-Qassabin القصابين
- Village
- Location within Syria
- Coordinates: 35°19′54″N 36°2′20″E
- Country: Syria
- Governorate: Latakia Governorate
- District: Jableh District
- Nahiyah: Ayn Shiqaq

Population (2004 census)
  - Total: 780
- Time zone: UTC+2 (EET)
  - Summer (DST): UTC+3 (EEST)

Al-Qassabin (Arabic: القصابين) is a town in northwestern Syria, administratively part of the Jableh District of the Latakia Governorate, and located south of Latakia. Nearby localities include Ayn al-Sharqiyah and Beit Yashout to the east and Siyano, Jableh and Bustan al-Basha to the northwest. According to the Syria Central Bureau of Statistics, al-Qassabin had a population of 780 in the 2004 census. Its inhabitants are predominantly Alawites.

The town is notable as the birthplace of the Syrian poet Ali Ahmed Said, better known as Adunis.
