= Geography of Syria =

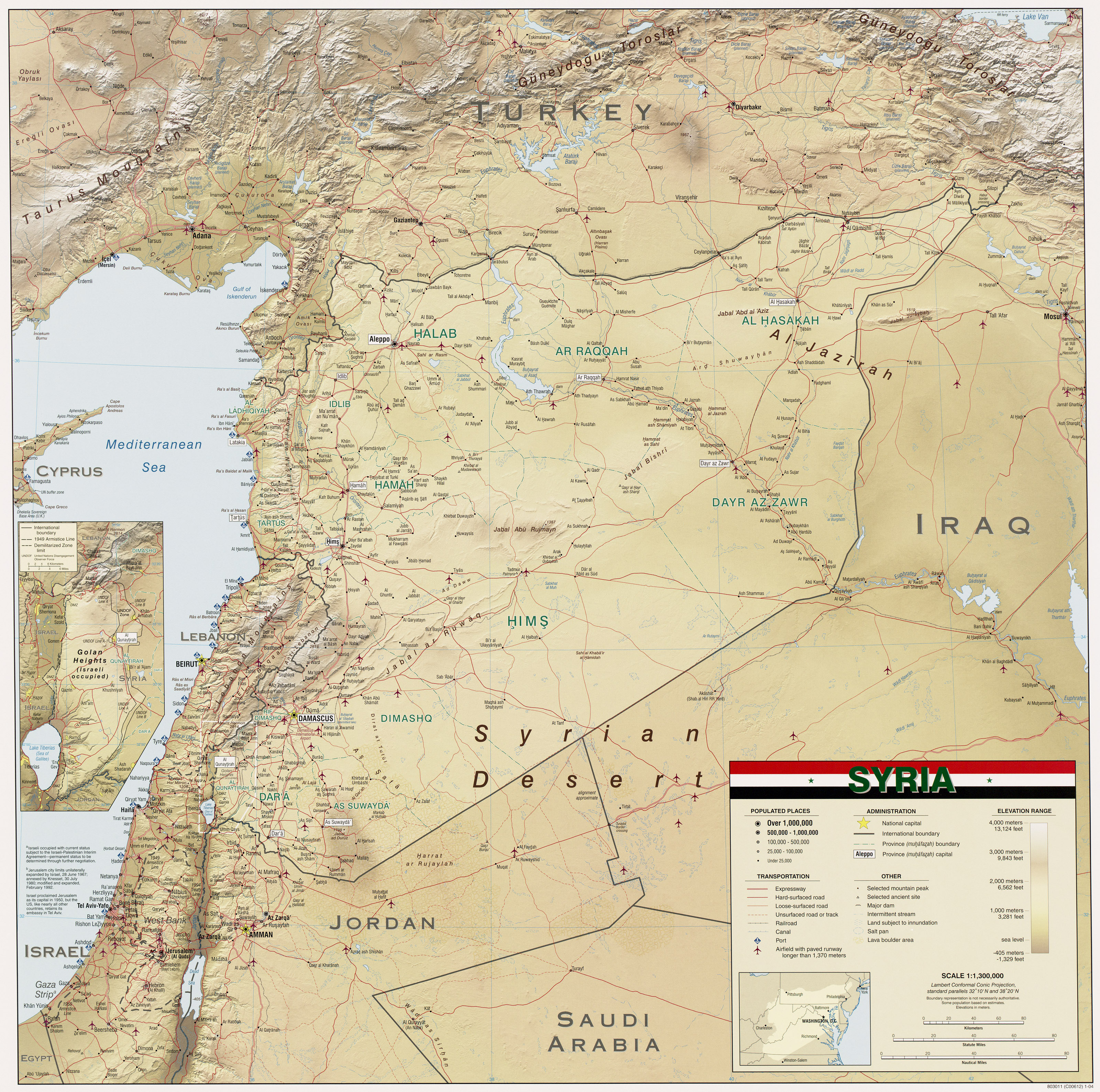
- Continent: Asia
- Region: Levant
- Area: Ranked 87th
  - Total: 183,980 km^{2} (71,040 sq mi)
  - Land: 99.4%
  - Water: 0.6%
- Coastline: 193 km (120 mi)
- Borders: Total land borders:2,253 km Iraq 605 km, Israel 76 km, Jordan 375 km, Lebanon 375 km, Turkey 822 km
- Highest point: Mount Hermon; 2,814 m (occupied by Israel since 12/2024)
- Lowest point: Unnamed location near Lake Tiberias (Sea of Galilee) −200 m (occupied by Israel since 6/1967)
- Longest river: Euphrates; 3,596 km
- Largest lake: Euphrates Lake

Syria is located in West Asia, north of the Arabian Peninsula, at the eastern end of the Mediterranean Sea. It is bordered by Turkey to the north, Lebanon and Israel to the west and southwest, Iraq to the east, and Jordan to the south. It consists of mountain ranges in the west and a steep area inland. In the east is the Syrian Desert and in the south is the Jabal al-Druze Range. The former is bisected by the Euphrates valley. The Euphrates Dam built in 1973 on the Euphrates created a reservoir named Euphrates Lake, the largest lake in Syria. The highest point in Syria is Mount Hermon (occupied by Israel) on the Lebanese border at 2,814 metres or 9,232 feet. Between the humid Mediterranean coast and the arid desert regions lies a semiarid steppe zone extending across three-quarters of the country, which receives hot, dry winds blowing across the desert. Syria is extensively depleted, with 28 percent of the land arable, 4 percent dedicated to permanent crops, 46 percent utilized as meadows and pastures, and only 3 percent forest and woodland.

Syria is divided into fourteen governorates, or muhafazat (singular: muhafazah). The governorates are divided into a total of sixty districts, or manatiq (sing. mintaqah), which are further divided into sub-districts, or nawahi (sing. nahiya). The capital Damascus is the second largest city in Syria, and the metropolitan area is a governorate on its own. Aleppo (population 2,301,570) in northern Syria is the largest city. Latakia along with Tartus are Syria's main ports on the Mediterranean Sea.

== Area and boundaries ==
Area:

- total: 185,180 square kilometres (71,498 sq mi)
  - country rank in the world: 87th
- land: 183,630 square kilometres (70,900 sq mi)
- water: 1,550 square kilometres (598 sq mi)

Area comparative:

- Australia comparative: approximately 4/5 the size of Victoria
- Canada comparative: approximately 4/9 the size of Newfoundland and Labrador
- United States comparative: approximately the size of Washington state
- United Kingdom comparative: approximately 3/4 the size of the United Kingdom
- European Union comparative: approximately twice the size of Portugal

Land boundaries:

- total: 2,253 kilometres (1,400 mi)
- border countries:
  - Iraq 605 kilometres (376 mi)
  - Israel 76 kilometres (47 mi)
  - Jordan 362 kilometres (225 mi)
  - Lebanon 394 kilometres (245 mi)
  - Turkey 822 kilometres (511 mi)

Coastline:

- 193 kilometres (120 mi)

Maritime claims:

- contiguous zone: 41 nautical miles (75.9 km; 47.2 mi)
- territorial sea: 35 nautical miles (64.8 km; 40.3 mi)

Elevation extremes:

- lowest point: unnamed location near Lake Tiberias (Sea of Galilee) −200 metres (−656 ft)
- highest point: Mount Hermon 2,814 metres (9,232 ft)

== Resources and land use ==
Natural resources: petroleum, phosphates, chrome and manganese ores, asphalt, iron ore, rock salt, marble, gypsum, hydropower

Land use:

- arable land: 24.8%
- permanent crops: 4.47%
- other: 70.73% (2005)

Irrigated land:

- 13.560 square kilometres (5.236 sq mi) (2003)

Total renewable water resources:

- 46.1 cubic kilometres (11.1 cu mi) (1997)

== Geographical regions ==
Map of Syria

The area includes about 185,180 square kilometers of deserts, plains, and mountains. It is divided into a coastal zone—with a narrow, double mountain belt enclosing a depression in the west—and a much larger eastern plateau. The climate is predominantly dry; about three-fifths of the country has less than 250 millimeters (9.84 in) of rain a year. Fertile land is the state's most important natural resource, and efforts have been made to increase the amount of arable land through irrigation projects.

=== Coastal plain ===
Along the Mediterranean, a narrow coastal plain stretches south from the Turkish border to Lebanon. The flatness of this littoral, covered with sand dunes, is broken only by lateral promontories running down from the mountains to the sea. The major ports are Latakia and Tartus. Syria claimed a territorial limit of 35 nautical miles (64.8 km; 40.3 mi) off its Mediterranean coastline. However, in 2003, Syria unilaterally declared its maritime zones, adhering to the 12 nautical miles allowed by the United Nations Law of the Sea.

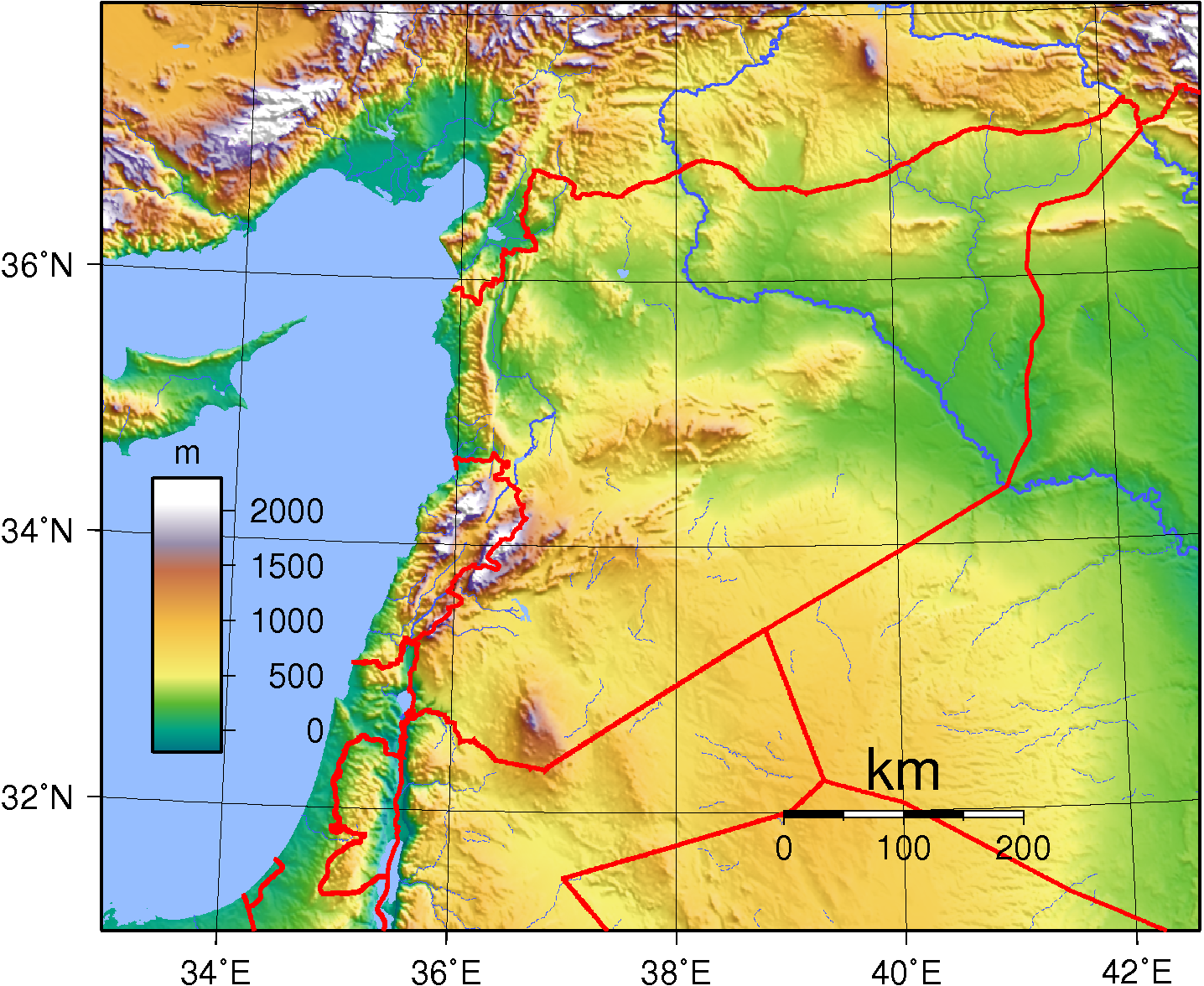
Topography of Syria

=== Upland areas ===
The Syrian Coastal Mountain Range, paralleling the coastal plain, has an average elevation of just over 1,212 meters above sea level; the highest peak, Nabi Yunis, is about 1,575 meters above sea level. The western slopes catch moisture-laden western sea winds and are thus more fertile and more heavily populated than the eastern slopes, which receive only hot, dry winds blowing across the desert. Before reaching the Lebanese border and the Anti-Lebanon Mountains, the Syrian Coastal Mountain Range range terminates, leaving a corridor—the Homs Gap—through which run the highway and railroad from Homs to the Lebanese port of Tripoli. For centuries the Homs Gap has been a favorite trade, and invasion route from the coast to the country's interior and to other parts of Asia. Eastward, the line of the Syrian Coastal Mountain Range is separated from the Jabal az Zawiyah range and the plateau region by the Al Ghab valley, a fertile, irrigated trench crossed by the meandering Orontes River.

Inland and farther south, the Anti-Lebanon Mountains rise to peaks of over 2,700 meters above sea level on the Syrian-Lebanese frontier and spread in spurs eastward toward the plateau region. The eastern slopes have little rainfall and vegetation and merge eventually with the desert.

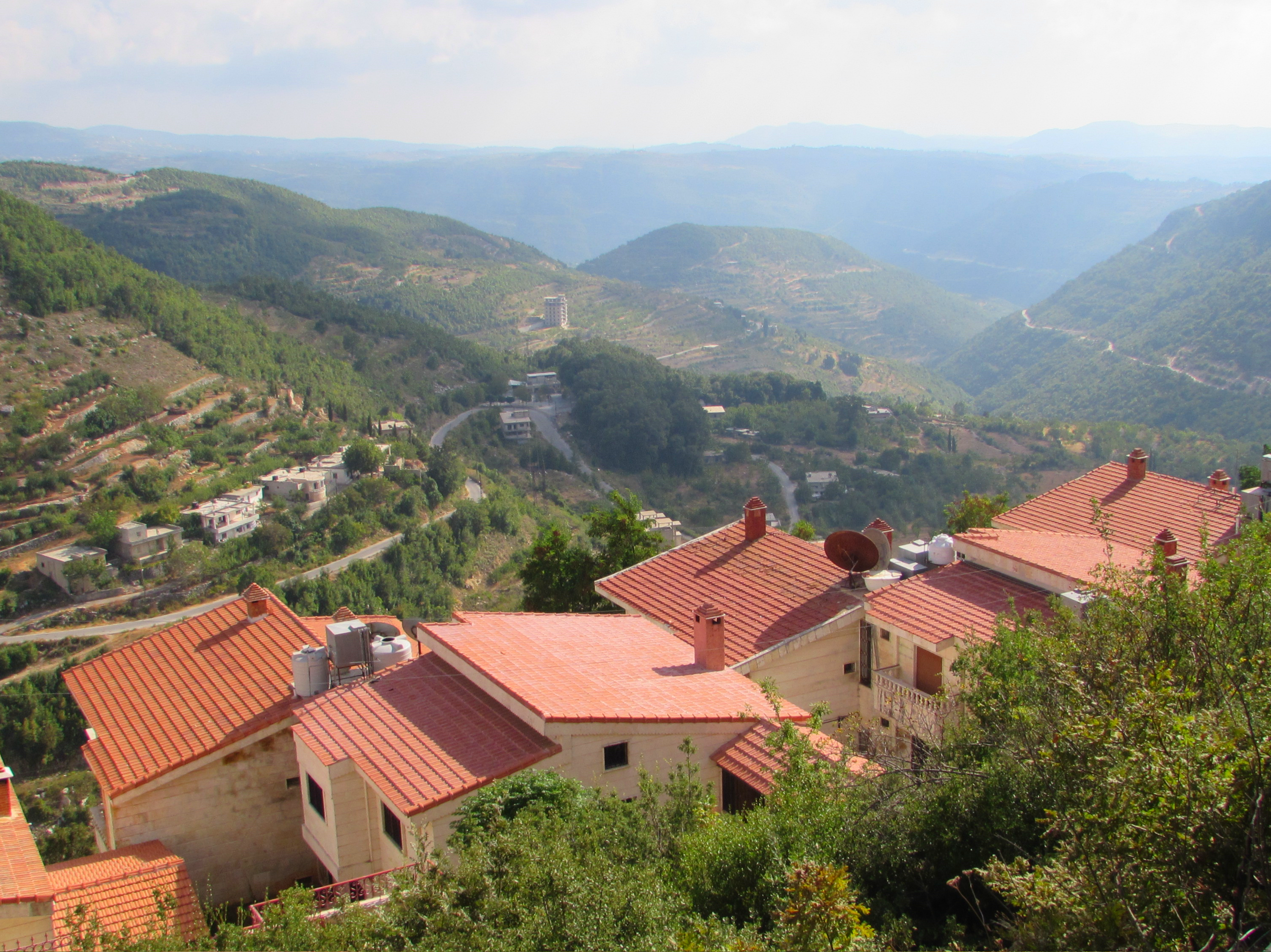
Slinfah, located in the Syrian Coastal Mountain Range

In the southwest, the lofty Mount Hermon (Jabal ash Shaykh), also on the border between Syria and Lebanon, descends to the Hawran Plateau that receives rain-bearing winds from the Mediterranean. All but the lowest slopes of Mount Hermon are uninhabited, however. Volcanic cones, some of which reach over 900 meters, intersperse the open, rolling, once-fertile Hawran Plateau south of Damascus and east of the Anti-Lebanon Mountains. Southwest of the Hawran lies the high volcanic region of the Jabal al-Druze range home of the country's Druze population. This is part of the Harrat al-Sham volcanic field that stretches all the way to Saudi Arabia. Northeast of Jabal al-Druze is a large lava field called Al-Safa that stands out in satellite views.

=== Eastern plateau ===
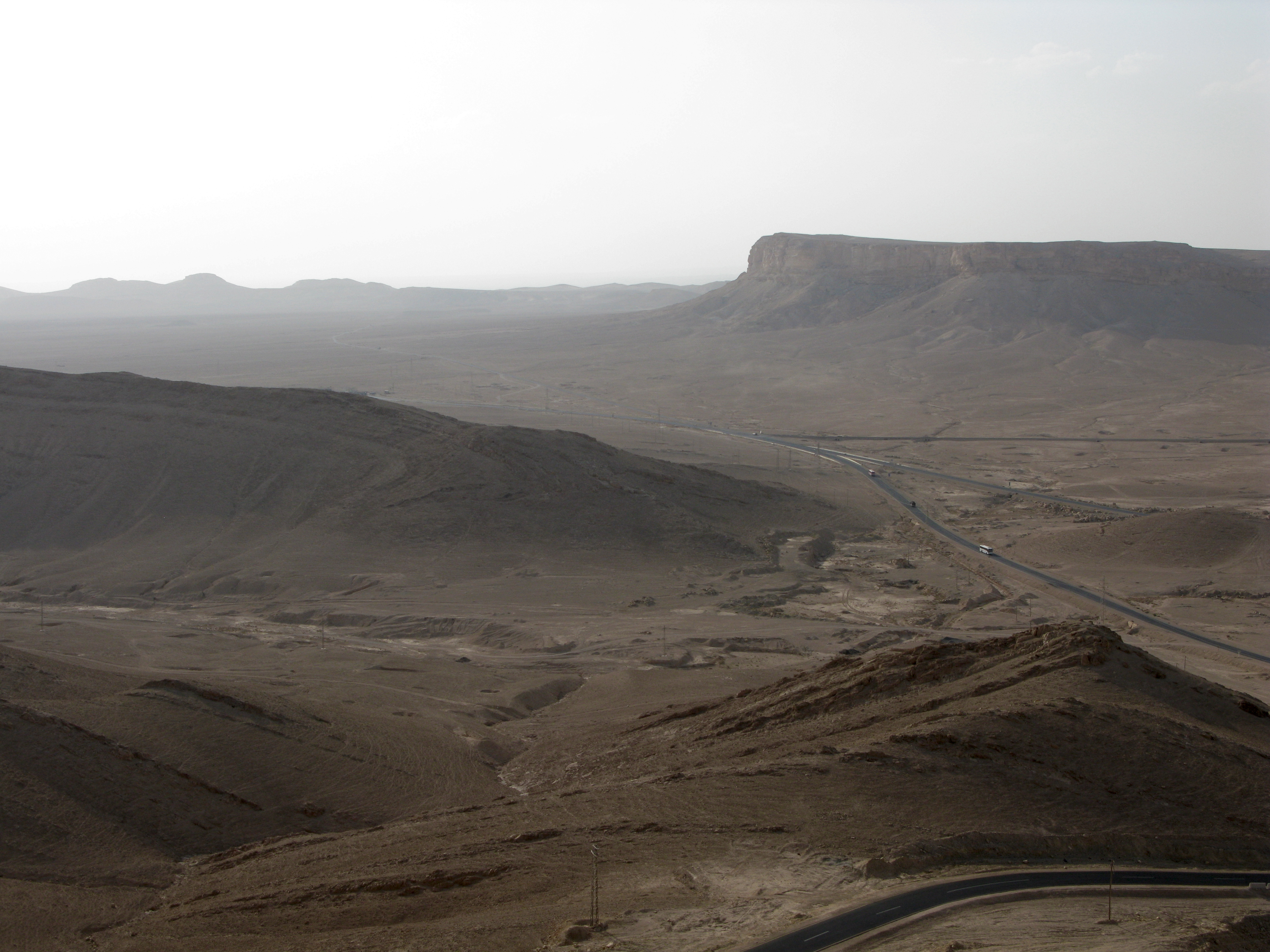
Syrian desert near Palmyra

The entire eastern plateau region is intersected by a low chain of mountains, the Jabal ar Ruwaq, the Jabal Abu Rujmayn, and the Jebel Bishri, extending northeastward from the Jabal Al Arab to the Euphrates. South of these mountains lies a barren desert region known as the Hamad. North of the Jabal ar Ruwaq and east of the city of Homs is another barren area known as the Homs Desert, which has a hard-packed dirt surface.

Northeast of the Euphrates, which originates in the mountains of Turkey and flows diagonally across Syria into Iraq, is the fertile Jazira region. This region is watered by two tributaries to the Euphrates, the Balikh and the Khabur. The area underwent irrigation improvements during the 1960s and 1970s, and it provides substantial cereal and cotton crops. Oil and natural gas discoveries in the extreme northeastern portion of the Jazira have significantly enhanced the region's economic potential.

== Water ==
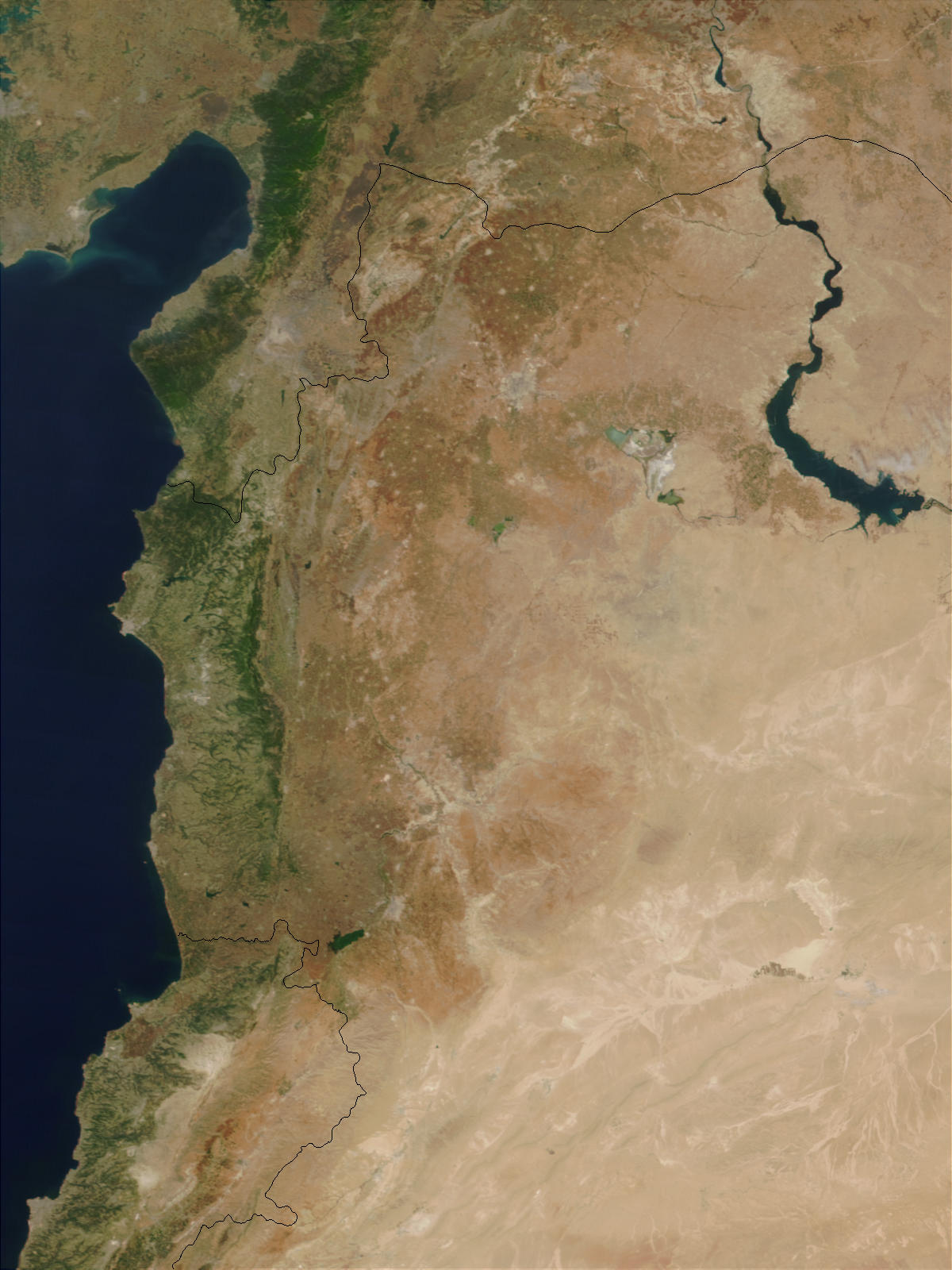
Flood in Northern Syria after collapse of the Zeyzoun Dam, June 2002

Syria is the twelfth most water stressed country in the world.

The country's waterways are of vital importance to its agricultural development. The longest and most important river is the Euphrates, which represents more than 80 percent of Syria's water resources. Its main left-bank tributaries, the Balikh and the Khabur, are small perennial rivers that both rise in the Syro-Turkish border region. The right-bank tributaries of the Euphrates are mostly small seasonal streams called wadis. In 1973, Syria completed construction of the Euphrates Dam on the Euphrates River upstream from the town of Raqqa. The dam created a reservoir named Euphrates Lake (Buhayrat al-Furat), a body of water about 80 kilometers long and averaging eight kilometers in width.

Throughout the arid plateau region east of Damascus, oases, streams, and a few interior rivers that empty into swamps, and small lakes provide water for local irrigation. Most important of these is the Barada, a river that rises in the Anti-Lebanon Mountains, and disappears into the desert. The Barada creates the Al Ghutah Oasis, site of Damascus. This verdant area, some 370 square kilometers, has enabled Damascus to prosper since ancient times. In the mid-1980s, the size of Al Ghutah was gradually being eroded as suburban housing and light industry from Damascus encroached on the oasis.

Areas in the Jazira have been brought under cultivation with the waters of the Khabur River (Nahr al Khabur). The Sinn, a minor river which marks the borders between Tartus Governorate and Latakia Governorate, is used to irrigate the area west of the Jabal an Nusayriyah, about 32 kilometers southwest of the port of Latakia. In the south the springs that feed the upper Yarmouk River are diverted for irrigation of the Hawran. Underground water reservoirs that are mainly natural springs are tapped for both irrigation and drinking. The richest in underground water resources is the Al Ghab region, which contains about 19 major springs and underground rivers that have a combined yield of thousands of liters per minute.

== Climate ==
Syria map of Köppen climate classification zones

The most striking feature of the climate is the contrast. Between the humid Mediterranean coast and the arid desert regions lies a semiarid steppe zone extending across three-quarters of the country and bordered on the west by the Anti-Lebanon Mountains and the Jabal an Nusayriyah, on the north by the Turkish mountain region, and on the southeast by the Jabal al Arab, Jabal ar Ruwaq, Jabal Abu Rujmayn, and the Jabal Bishri ranges.

Rainfall in the coastal region is fairly abundant, annual precipitation ranging between 750 and 1,200 millimeters (30 and 47 in). Most of the rain, carried by winds from the Mediterranean, falls between November and May. Daily mean temperatures range from 7 °C (45 °F) in January to 27 °C (81 °F) in August. Because the high ridges of the Jabal an Nusayriyah catch most of the rains from the Mediterranean, the Al Ghab depression, located east of these mountains, is in a relatively arid zone with warm, dry winds and scanty rainfall. Frost is unknown in any season, although the peaks of the Jabal an Nusayriyah are sometimes snow-covered.

Farther south, rain-bearing clouds from the Mediterranean pass through the gap between the Jabal an Nusayriyah and the Anti-Lebanon Mountains, reaching the area of Homs and, sometimes, the steppe region east of that city. Still farther to the south, however, the Anti-Lebanon Mountains bar the rains from the Mediterranean, and the area, including the capital city of Damascus, becomes part of the semiarid climatic zone of the steppe, with precipitation averaging less than 200 millimeters (8 in) a year and with daily mean temperatures ranging from 5 °C (41 °F) in January to 29 °C (84 °F) in July and August. The vicinity of the capital is, nevertheless, verdant and cultivable because of irrigation from the Barada River by aqueducts built during Roman times.

In the southeast, the humidity decreases, and annual precipitation falls below 100 millimeters (4 in). The scanty amounts of rain, moreover, are highly variable from year to year, causing periodic droughts. In the barren stony desert south of the Jabal ar Ruwaq, Jabal Abu Rujmayn, and Jabal Bishri ranges, maximum temperatures in July often exceed 45 °C (113 °F). Sandstorms, common during February and May, damage vegetation and prevent grazing. North of the desert ranges and east of the Al Ghab depression lie the vast steppes of the plateau, where cloudless skies and high daytime temperatures prevail during the summer, but frosts, at times severe, are common from November to March. Precipitation averages 250 millimeters (10 in) a year but falls below 200 millimeters (8 in) in a large belt along the southern desert area. In this belt, only the Euphrates and Khabur rivers provide sufficient water for settlement and cultivation.

Lattakia

Climate chart (precipitation, max. and min. temperature)
J	F	M	A	M	J	J	A	S	O	N	D
163 16 8	100 16 9	91 18 11	44 22 14	21 24 17	4.5 27 21	0.9 29 24	4.5 30 25	7.8 29 22	67 27 18	95 22 14	161 17 10
- █ Average max. and min. temperatures in °C
- █ Precipitation totals in mm
Imperial conversion
J	F	M	A	M	J	J	A	S	O	N	D
6.4 60 47	3.9 61 48	3.6 65 52	1.7 71 57	0.8 76 63	0.2 80 70	0 84 75	0.2 85 76	0.3 84 72	2.6 80 65	3.7 72 57	6.3 63 50
- █ Average max. and min. temperatures in °F
- █ Precipitation totals in inches

Damascus

Climate chart (precipitation, max. and min. temperature)
J	F	M	A	M	J	J	A	S	O	N	D
28 13 0	23 15 1	17 19 4	7.9 25 7	3.3 30 11	0.4 34 14	0 37 17	0 36 17	0.2 33 13	7.1 28 9	21 20 4	26 14 1
- █ Average max. and min. temperatures in °C
- █ Precipitation totals in mm
Imperial conversion
J	F	M	A	M	J	J	A	S	O	N	D
1.1 55 33	0.9 59 34	0.7 66 39	0.3 76 45	0.1 85 51	0 94 58	0 98 62	0 97 62	0 92 55	0.3 82 48	0.8 69 39	1 58 34
- █ Average max. and min. temperatures in °F
- █ Precipitation totals in inches

== Environmental concerns ==
Natural hazards:

- dust storms, sandstorms, earthquakes

Environment – current issues:

- deforestation; overgrazing; soil erosion; desertification; water pollution from dumping of raw sewage and wastes from petroleum refining; inadequate supplies of potable water

Environment – international agreements:

- party to: Biodiversity, Climate Change, Desertification, Endangered Species, Hazardous Wastes, Ozone Layer Protection, Ship Pollution (MARPOL 73/78), Wetlands
- signed, but not ratified: Environmental Modification

== See also ==
- Geography of Asia
