= Qurn Hulya =

Qurn Hulya قرن حليه Qarn Halya, Qorn Haliyeh
- Village
- Location in Syria
- Coordinates: 35°21′19″N 36°9′45″E
- Country: Syria
- Governorate: Latakia
- District: Jableh
- Subdistrict: Ayn al-Sharqiyah

Population (2004)
  - Total: 1,053
- Time zone: UTC+3 (EET)
  - Summer (DST): UTC+2 (EEST)
- City Qrya Pcode: C3664

Qurn Hulya (Arabic: قرن حليه; also transliterated Qarn Halyah or Qorn Haliyeh) is a village in northwestern Syria, administratively part of the Jableh District in Latakia Governorate. According to the Syria Central Bureau of Statistics (CBS), Qurn Hulya had a population of 1,053 in the 2004 census. Its inhabitants are Alawites. The village is situated on the approaches of Jabal al-Sha'ra, one of the highest points of the Syrian Coastal Mountain Range, built on a rocky cliff in between two ravines.

It was among the Alawite villages which revolted or resisted Ottoman authority in the period immediately following the Ottoman conquest of Syria in 1517. In 1519, it was recorded to have 500 inhabitants. By 1547, Qurn Hulya was no longer in a state of rebellion and was recorded to have paid 480 dirhems or piasters and its inhabitants were classified as part of the Alawite Kalbiyya tribal confederation. By 1645, 4,600 dirhems were assessed from the village, according to tax records.

== Sources ==
- Winter, Stefan (2016). A History of the 'Alawis: From Medieval Aleppo to the Turkish Republic. Princeton and Oxford: Princeton University Press. ISBN 9780691167787.
