= Bsheili =

Town in northwestern Syria

Bsheili بشيلي Bshili, Bashili, Bshele
- Town
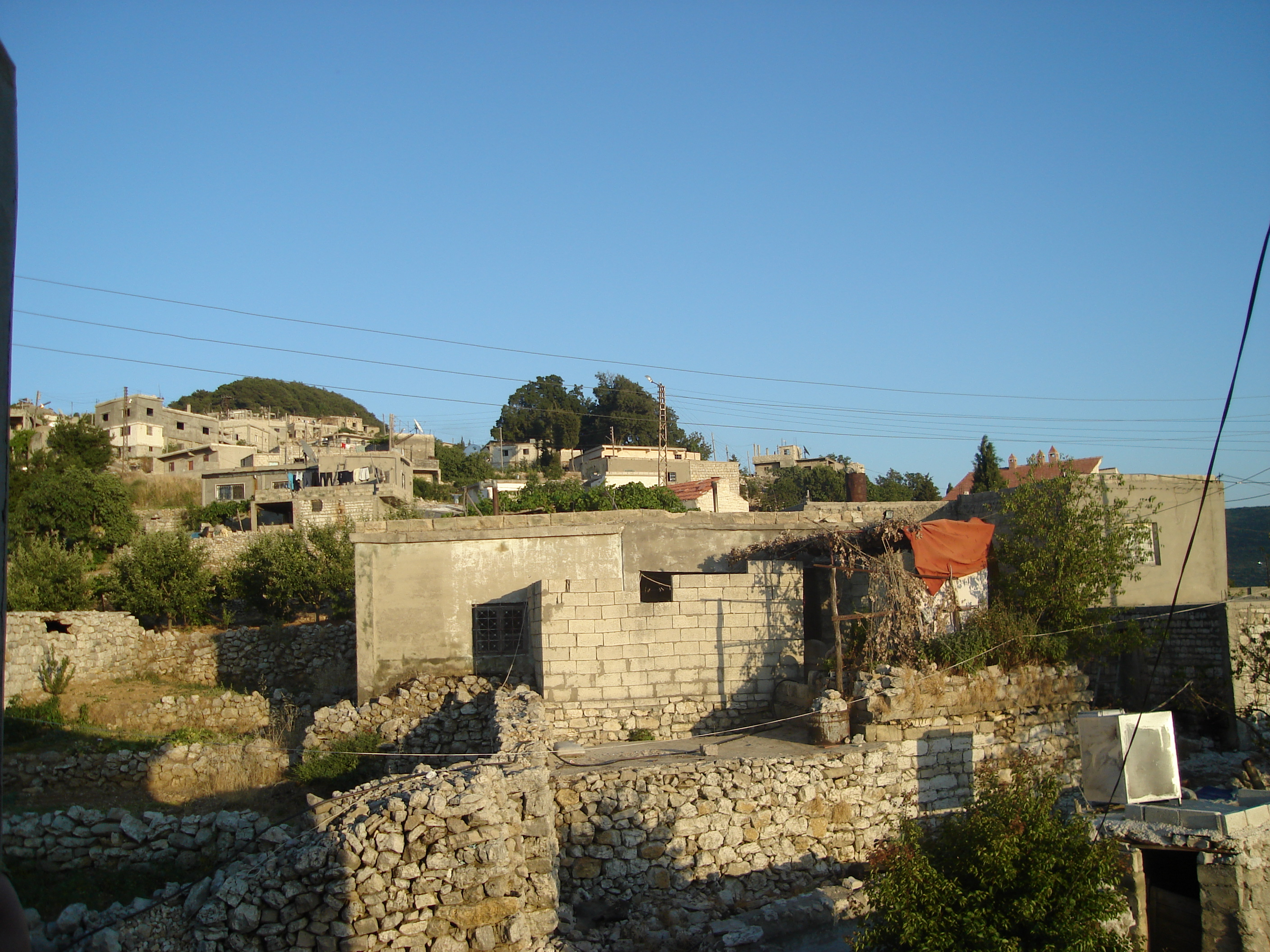
- Bsheili, 2007

- Location within Syria
- Coordinates: 35°17′11″N 36°9′57″E
- Country: Syria
- Governorate: Latakia
- District: Jableh
- Subdistrict: Beit Yashout

Population (2004 census)
  - Total: 683
- Time zone: UTC+2 (EET)
  - Summer (DST): UTC+3 (EEST)

Bsheili (بشيلي; also transliterated Bshili, Bashili or Bshele) is a village in northwestern Syria, administratively part of the Jableh District of the Latakia Governorate. According to the Syria Central Bureau of Statistics, Bsheili had a population of 683 in the 2004 census. Its inhabitants are Alawites.
