= Hallet Ara =

Hallet Ara حلة عارا
- Village
- Location in Syria
- Coordinates: 35°19′43″N 36°8′32″E
- Country: Syria
- Governorate: Latakia
- District: Jableh District
- Subdistrict: Beit Yashout

Population (2004)
  - Total: 1,015
- Time zone: UTC+3 (EET)
  - Summer (DST): UTC+2 (EEST)
- City Qrya Pcode: C3664

Hallet Ara (Arabic: حلة عارا) is a Syrian village in the Jableh District in Latakia Governorate. According to the Syria Central Bureau of Statistics (CBS), Hallet Ara had a population of 1,015 in the 2004 census. Its inhabitants are Alawites. The village is built across a steep escarpment above the Hallet Ara valley. It was among the Alawite villages that revolted or resisted Ottoman authority in the period immediately following the Ottoman conquest of Syria in 1517. By 1547, the village was recorded to have paid 472 dirhems or piasters and its inhabitants were classified as part of the Alawite Kalbiyya tribal confederation.

== Notable people ==
- Ali Haydar, the commander of the Syrian Special Forces for 26 years.

== Sources ==
- Winter, Stefan (2016). A History of the 'Alawis: From Medieval Aleppo to the Turkish Republic. Princeton and Oxford: Princeton University Press. ISBN 9780691167787.
