= Ali Haydar (Syrian army officer) =

Syrian military officer (1932–2022)

- علي حيدر
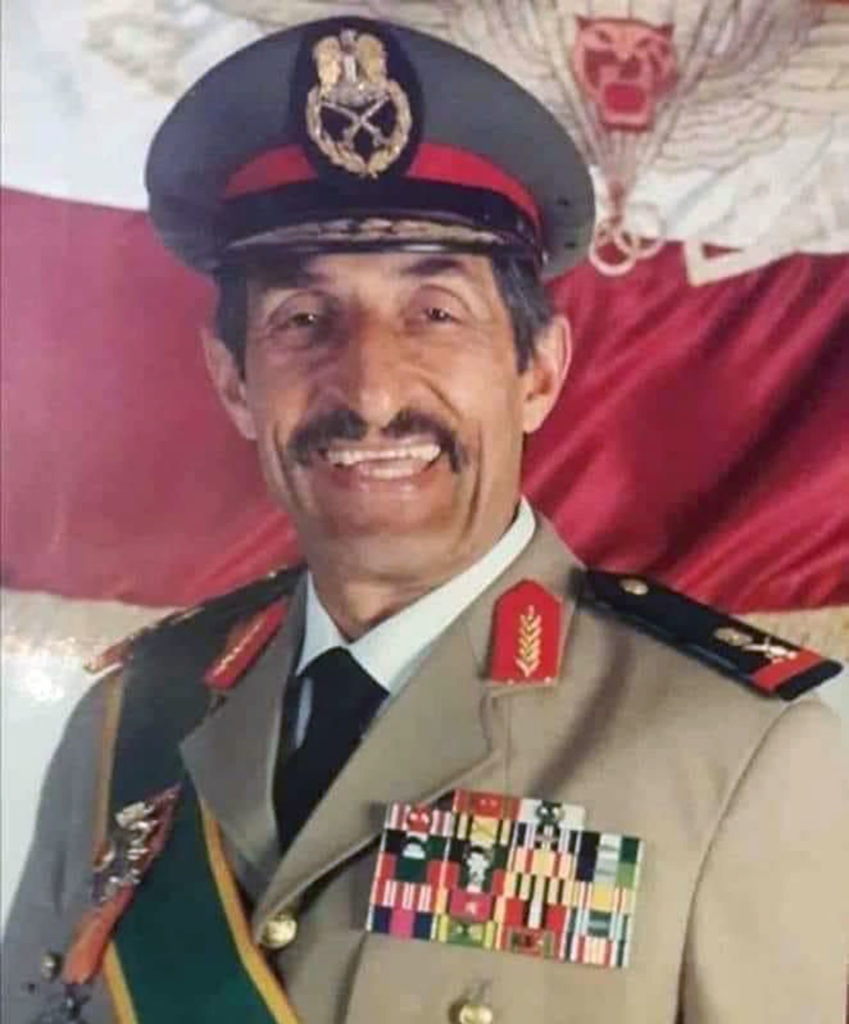
- Haydar in 1987
- Born: 1932; Hallet Ara, Jableh District, Alawite State
- Died: 5 August 2022 (aged 89–90); Beit Yashout, Latakia, Syria
- Military career
- Allegiance: Second Syrian Republic (1952–1958); United Arab Republic (1958–1961); Second Syrian Republic (1961–1963); Ba'athist Syria (1963–1994)
- Branch: Syrian Arab Army
- Service years: 1952–1994
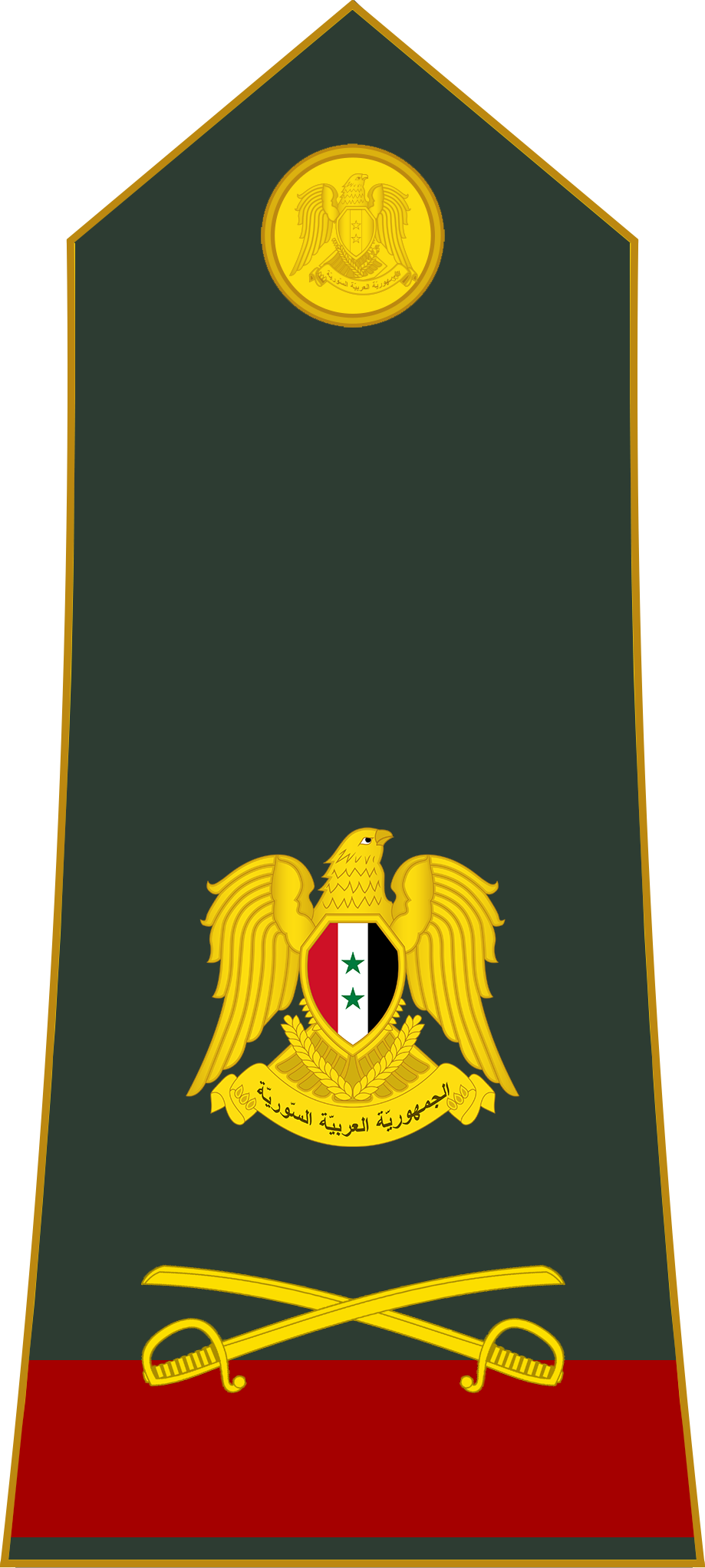
- Rank: Major General
- Unit: 14th Special Forces Division
- Commands: Special Forces Command (1968–1988, 1990–1994)
- Conflicts: Yom Kippur War; Lebanese Civil War; Islamist uprising in Syria; Siege of Aleppo; Hama Massacre

Ali Haydar (Arabic: علي حيدر, romanized: ʻAlī Ḥaydar; 1932 – 5 August 2022), known as the "Father of the Syrian Special Forces", was a Syrian military officer who was the commander of the Syrian Special Forces for 26 years. He was a close confidant to President Hafez al-Assad and one of the members of Assad's inner circle. Born in the village of Hallet Ara, Haydar was a member of the Ba'ath Party from his youth. He was commissioned into the Syrian Army in 1952 after a stint studying at the Homs Military Academy. After the Ba'ath Party seized power in a 1963 coup d'état, Haydar was put in charge of Syria's special forces and supported al-Assad in his rise to the presidency. During this time he was deployed to Lebanon during their civil war. Haydar opposed the 1984 coup d'état attempt led by Rifaat al-Assad, instead remaining loyal to Hafez al-Assad. After suffering an aneurysm and leaving his post in 1988, he returned to lead the special forces again in the early 1990s. At the time a Major General, he was formally removed from his position and then imprisoned in August 1994, though he was treated well during his brief prison stay and was released without a trial or public humiliation. Haydar died in Latakia at the age of 90.

== Early life and family ==
Haydar was born in 1932 in the village of Hallet Ara, Jableh District, which was then part of the Alawite State set up by the French administration in Syria.

It is not quite clear which Alawite tribe Haydar belonged to, and different sources either cite him as being a member of the Khayatin tribe, which is traditionally allied with the Kalbiyya tribe; to which the Assad family belongs. or possibly to the Haddadin tribe, to which Salah Jadid and Hafez al-Assad's wife Anisa Makhlouf belonged. His father was a religious sheikh. His uncle, Ahmad Mohammad Haydar, was also a well-known sheikh who advocated for Alawites to abandon superstitions and blend with mainstream Islam.

He was a childhood friend of Hafez al-Assad.

Two of his five children married outside the Alawite faith, with his son marrying a Sunni and his daughter marrying a Shiite.

== Career ==
Haydar joined the Ba'ath Party of Michel Aflaq as a schoolboy and was commissioned as an infantry officer in the Syrian Army in 1952, after studying at the Homs Military Academy.

The Ba'ath Party came to power in Syria following the 1963 Syrian coup d'état. Haydar went on to become the Commander of Syria's Special Forces in 1968 after training at the Soviet airborne forces' academy. Haydar remained close to his childhood friend Hafez al-Assad, and supported him in the 1970 Syrian Corrective Revolution, which brought Hafez to power. Haydar provided military support for Hafez during the coup, helping to oust Salah Jadid and President Nureddin al-Atassi.

Haydar remained as Commander of the Special Forces under Hafez, and emerged as a key figure in Hafez's inner circle, and was one of Hafez's most loyal officers. Haydar's high status and membership of a different Alawite tribe helped Hafez consolidate his hold over the Alawite community, which he also maintained through marriage and the appointment of other tribal representatives to high office. Haydar's Special Forces expanded in size to 25,000 men, and formed a key part of the Syrian government's security apparatus. The Special Forces were trained in airborne operations, and were rivaled on power only by the Defense Companies controlled by Hafez's brother, Rifaat. As such, the 14th Division became a strong counter-weight to the Defense Companies, as both these formations were largely airborne divisions. However, the Special Forces lacked the heavy armour and artillery capabilities which Rifaat's forces had. Instead, its specialization was in anti-Tank operations and sniper warfare. Haydar pioneered very aggressive tactics and training, and the Syrian special forces' snipers and their sniper doctrine and tactics acquired a fearsome reputation which persists to this day.

Under Haydar, the Special Forces units were deployed to Lebanon as part of the Syrian intervention in the Lebanese Civil War. During the war they engaged with PLO units under the command of Yasser Arafat.

Haydar left his command in 1988 following an aneurysm, although later returned to his post in the early 1990s. He totally rejected any form of peace with Israel at the Madrid Conference of 1991.

Haydar was deployed to Lebanon in 1982 following the Israeli offensive, with his Special Forces engaging the IDF. The Special Forces played a key role during the war, and were mainly stationed in Bhamdun and Tripoli. They also remained a key component of the Syrian government's defenses against internal and external threats, with units stationed on Mount Qasioun overlooking Damascus, and in the port city of Tartus.

=== 1984 coup attempt ===
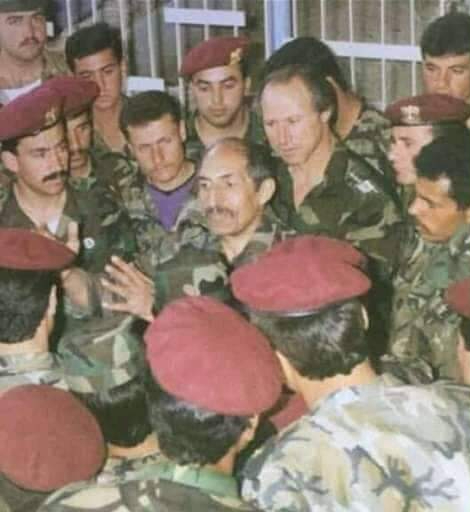
Haydar with soldiers

Hafez al-Assad fell ill in November 1983, and Rifaat al-Assad began planning a coup to seize the Presidency. Haydar was close to Rifaat, however he fiercely refused when Rifaat asked him to support him in the coup. Haydar reportedly said:

"I recognise no leader in the country other than Hafez al-Assad! What I have of power and prestige I owe to him. I am a soldier in his service and a slave to his beck and call. While I am alive I bear obedience to him and will not fall away from him."

Haydar's staunch refusal to partake in any coup reinforced his loyalty in Hafez's eyes. Haydar later confronted Rifaat in March 1984, when Rifaat attempted his coup. The Defense Companies under Rifaat's command began setting up checkpoints and roadblocks in Damascus, began to forcibly occupy State buildings, Police Stations, began to disarm the Police, and even tried to infiltrate his forces into the Defence Ministry HQ. Haydar deployed his Special Forces against the Defense Companies of Rifaat on the streets of Damascus, using his Anti-Tank platoons to directly challenge Rifaat's T-72 Tank units which were threatening government buildings. Haydar also ordered his sniper platoons which were deployed by parachute or from helicopters, to take up key positions near the residences of known Defense Company commanders in order to psychologically terrorize them. Sniper units also tactically besieged the Mezzeh Airbase and some other vital Defense Company bases and installations. Potential civil war was only averted through the action of Hafez, who intervened and placated Rifaat by making him Vice President, before sending him off into exile.

== Arrest and retirement ==
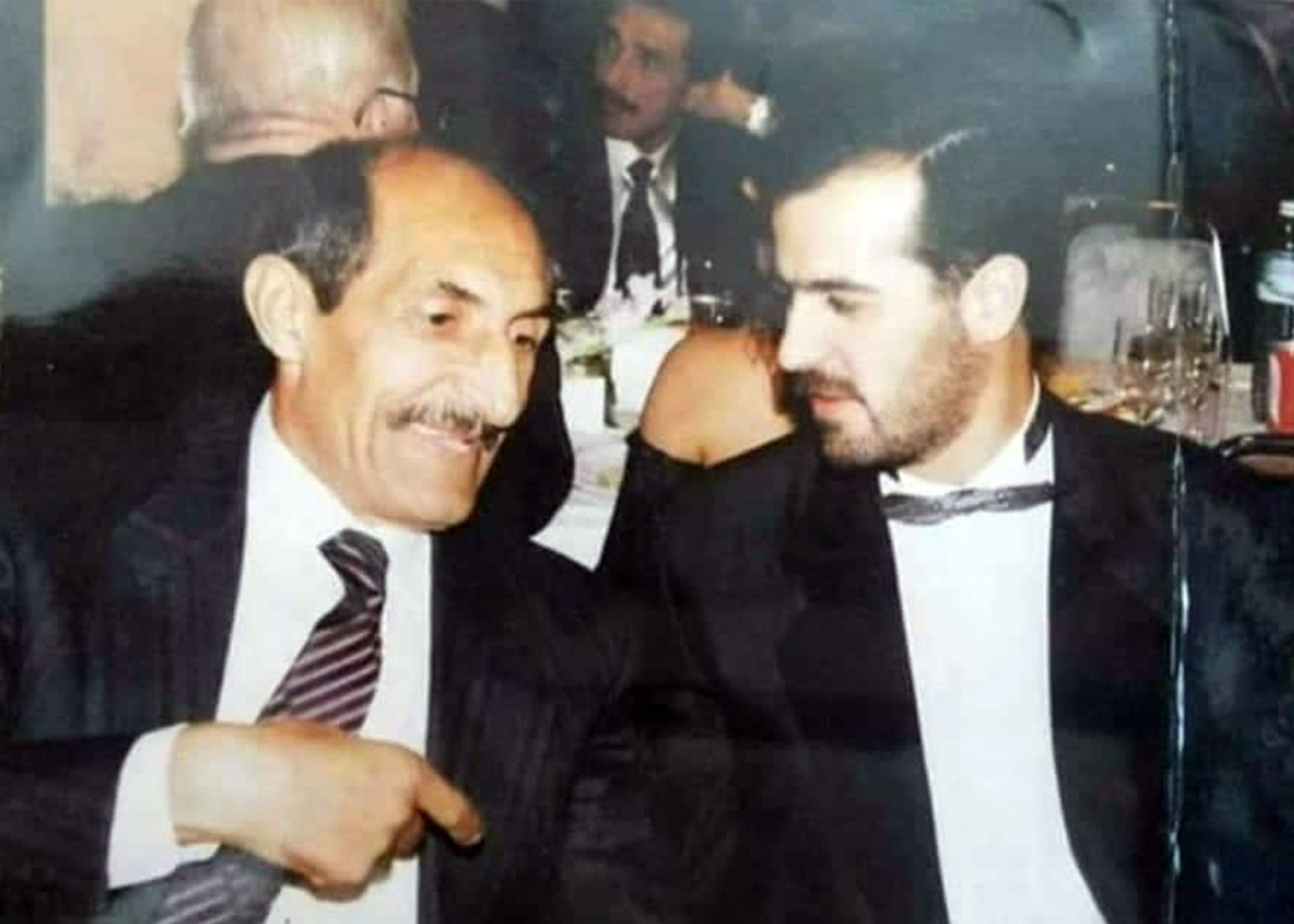
Haydar with Bassel Assad

Haydar, a Major General, was formally removed from his position as Commander of Syria's Special Forces and then imprisoned on 3 August 1994. Syrian sources talking to the al-Hayat newspaper claimed that Haydar had been imprisoned for failing to follow military orders, although others claimed the arrest followed criticism from Haydar of Hafez al-Assad for recalling Bashar al-Assad to Syria from London, where he was studying, in order to groom him for command following the death of his brother, Bassel al-Assad. Haydar seemingly objected to the idea of Hafez's plans to keep succession to the Syrian Presidency within the Assad family. It was also suggested his removal was tied to his previous strong opposition to the peace talks then taking place between Syrian and Israeli envoys in Washington DC.

His arrest and imprisonment happened during a restructuring of the Syrian Army designed to remove influential Alawite military leaders and in turn pave the way for the succession of the Presidency from Hafez al-Assad. It was also suggested that Haydar's arrest was accompanied by the arrest of a number of top ranking Alawite officials who either supported Haydar or shared his criticism of Hafez' plans for the Presidency. He was replaced by Maj. Gen. Ali Habib, a member of the Alawite Matawirah clan from Safita. Habib had previously commanded the Seventh Mechanized Division and had led Syrian forces in the 1991 Gulf War. A Jordanian analyst quoted by The Christian Science Monitor suggested Habib was chosen due to having shown himself willing to follow Hafez's orders in the Gulf War, as it showed commitment to Hafez's command over long standing Ba'athist ideological positions against what it saw as Western Imperialism.

Despite his detention, Haydar was never brought to trial or publicly humiliated, but was instead well treated in his brief captivity before being released and retired. He remained an important figure in the Syrian Ba'ath Party and the Syrian Army until Hafez's death in 2000. He attended Hafez's funeral and publicly pledged allegiance to Bashar as the new president. Haydar then retired to his hometown of Hallet Ara and became deeply religious in his last years.

== Death ==
Ali Haydar died in Beit Yashout, Latakia, Syria, on 5 August 2022.
