= Mount Nabi Yunis =

Mount Nabi Yunis may refer to the following mountains:

- Mount Nabi Yunis, Palestine — a mountain in the Judean Mountains (also known as the Hebron Hills) near Hebron and the highest point in the State of Palestine
- Mount Nabi Yunis, Syria — a mountain near Latakia, Syria and the highest point in the Syrian Coastal Mountain Range
