= Ayn Shiqaq =

Town in northwestern Syria

Ayn aShiqaq عين شقاق Ain Shiqaq
- Town
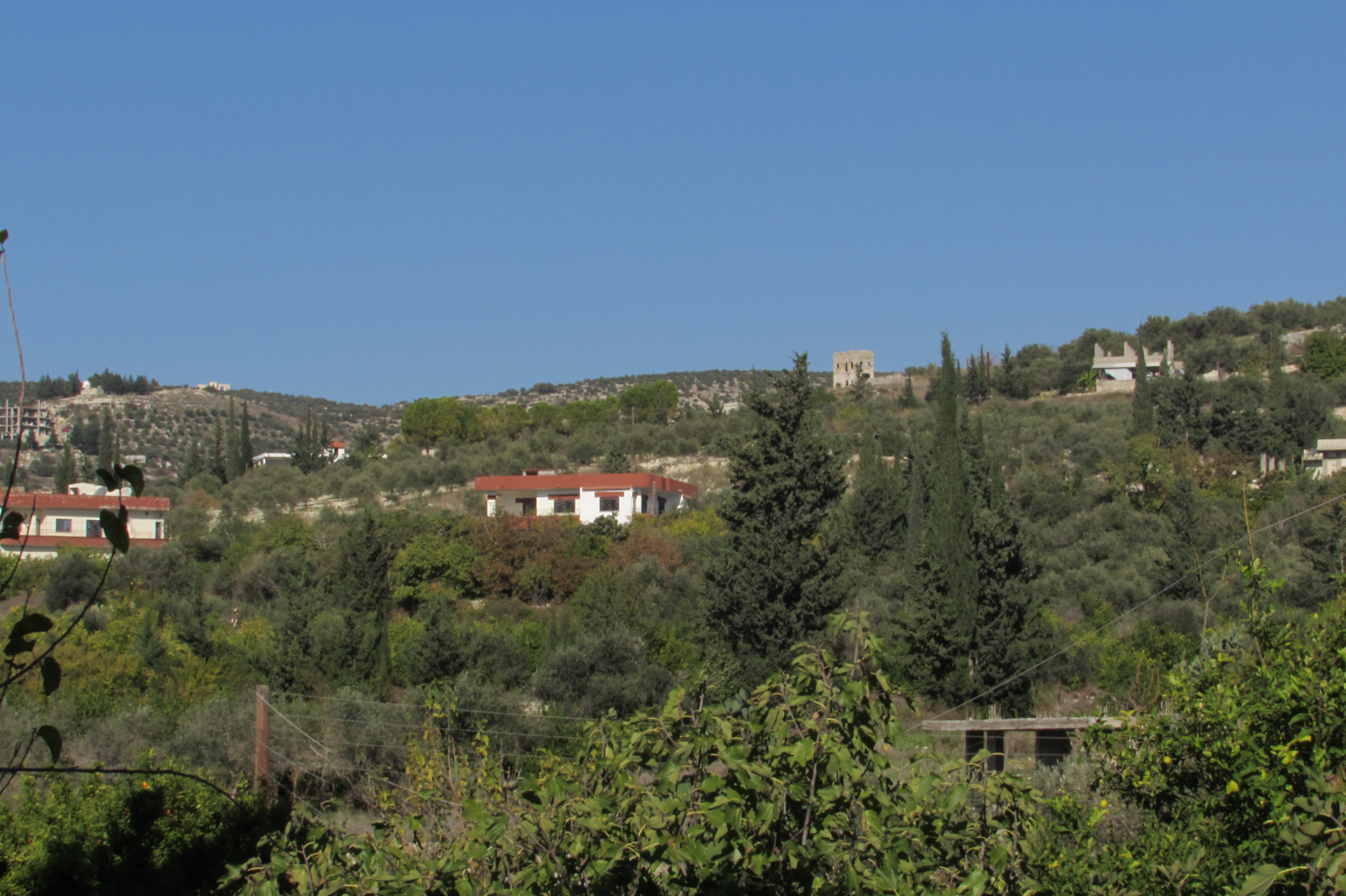

- Location within Syria
- Coordinates: 35°23′41″N 36°1′51″E
- Country: Syria
- Governorate: Latakia
- District: Jableh
- Subdistrict: Ayn al-Shiqaq

Population (2004)
  - Total: 4,125
- Time zone: UTC+2 (EET)
  - Summer (DST): UTC+3 (EEST)

Ayn al-Shiqaq (Arabic: عين شقاق, also spelled Ain al-Shiqaq) is a town in northwestern Syria, administratively part of the Jableh District in the Latakia Governorate, located south of Latakia. Nearby localities include Zama to the southeast, al-Qassabin to the south, Siyano to the southwest, Jableh to the west, Qardaha to the northeast, al-Budi and Harf al-Musaytirah to the east. According to the Syria Central Bureau of Statistics, Ayn al-Shiqaq had a population of 4,125 in the 2004 census. It is the administrative center of the Ayn al-Shiqaq nahiyah ("subdistrict") which contains 15 localities with a total population of 16,031 in 2004. The inhabitants are predominantly Alawites. Ayn al-Shiqaq is the birthplace of noted Syrian poet Nadim Muhammad (1907–1994).

== Bibliography ==
- Kedar, Mordechai (2006). Asad in Search of Legitimacy: Message and Rhetoric in the Syrian Press Under Hafiz and Bashar. Sussex Academic Press. ISBN 1845191854.
