= Mutawwar =

Mutawwar متور Matwar, Matawwar
- Village
- Location in Syria
- Coordinates: 35°20′50″N 36°8′13″E
- Country: Syria
- Governorate: Latakia
- District: Jableh
- Subdistrict: Ayn al-Sharqiyah

Population (2004)
  - Total: 735
- Time zone: UTC+3 (EET)
  - Summer (DST): UTC+2 (EEST)
- City Qrya Pcode: C3664

Mutawwar (Arabic: متور; also transliterated Matwar or Matawwar) is a village in northwestern Syria, administratively part of the Jableh District in Latakia Governorate. According to the Syria Central Bureau of Statistics (CBS), Mutawwar had a population of 735 in the 2004 census. Its inhabitants are Alawites. It was among the Alawite villages which revolted or resisted Ottoman authority in the period immediately following the Ottoman conquest of Syria in 1517. It remained in a state of rebellion by not forwarding its grain to the government in 1525. By 1547, was recorded to have paid 1,284 dirhems or piasters and its inhabitants were classified as part of the Alawite Kalbiyya tribal confederation.

== Sources ==
- Winter, Stefan (2016). A History of the 'Alawis: From Medieval Aleppo to the Turkish Republic. Princeton and Oxford: Princeton University Press. ISBN 9780691167787.
