= Dweir Baabda =

Dweir Baabda دوير بعبده
- Village
- Location in Syria
- Coordinates: 35°14′53″N 36°2′34″E
- Country: Syria
- Governorate: Latakia
- District: Jableh
- Subdistrict: al-Qutailibiyah
- Elevation: 700 m (2,300 ft)

Population (2004)
  - Total: 2,529
- Time zone: UTC+2 (EET)
  - Summer (DST): UTC+3 (EEST)

Dweir Baabda (Arabic: دوير بعبده, Duwayr Ba'bda or Duweir Baabda) is a village in northwestern Syria administratively part of the Latakia Governorate, located southeast of Latakia. It is situated off a secondary road, at the summit of a mountain in the coastal Nusayriyah Range and has an elevation of over 700 meters above sea level. Nearby localities include Daliyah to the east, Baabda to the south, Baniyas to the southwest, Qurfays to the west, Jableh to the northwest, al-Qassabin to the north and Ayn al-Sharqiyah to the northeast. According to the Syria Central Bureau of Statistics (CBS), Dweir Baabda had a population was 2,529 in 2004. Its inhabitants are predominantly Alawites.

The ruins of a monastery dating to the Byzantine era is present in the village. Dweir Baabda is a rural village whose inhabitants engage largely in agriculture, cultivating tobacco, olives and apples. It serves as a center of sorts for some of the neighboring localities, providing health care and pharmaceutical services. It also contains the only major mall in the vicinity. Schools began being built in Dweir Baabda in the 1920s. In the 1960s Dweir Baabda was described as a "large village." It currently spreads over a large area.

Salah Jadid, the late strongman of Syria who was overthrown by Hafez al-Assad in 1970, was born in Dweir Baabda.

== Bibliography ==
- Hanna Batatu (1999). Syria's peasantry, the descendants of its lesser rural notables, and their politics (Illustrated ed.). Princeton University Press. ISBN 0691002541.
- Boulanger, Robert, ed. (1966). The Middle East, Lebanon, Syria, Jordan, Iraq, Iran. Hachette.
- Lee, Jess (2010). Syria Handbook. Footprint Travel Guides. ISBN 978-1907263033.
- Seale, Patrick (1990). Asad of Syria: The Struggle for the Middle East. University of California Press. ISBN 978-0520069763.
