= Hamam al-Qarahleh =

Hamam El Qarahleh حمام القراحلة
- Village
- Location in Syria
- Coordinates: 35°17′27″N 36°4′40″E
- Country: Syria
- Governorate: Latakia
- District: Jableh District
- Subdistrict: Al-Qutailibiyah Subdistrict

Population (2004)
  - Total: 921
- Time zone: UTC+3 (EET)
  - Summer (DST): UTC+2 (EEST)
- City Qrya Pcode: C3609

Hamam El Qarahleh (Arabic: حمام القراحلة) is a Syrian village in the Jableh District in Latakia Governorate. According to the Syria Central Bureau of Statistics (CBS), Hamam El Qarahleh had a population of 921 in the 2004 census.
