= Halbakko =

Halbakko حلبكو Helbakko
- Village
- Location in Syria
- Coordinates: 35°20′3″N 36°9′25″E
- Country: Syria
- Governorate: Latakia
- District: Jableh
- Subdistrict: Beit Yashout

Population (2004)
  - Total: 292
- Time zone: UTC+3 (EET)
  - Summer (DST): UTC+2 (EEST)
- City Qrya Pcode: C3660

Halbakko (Arabic: حلبكو; also transliterated Helbakko) is a village in northwestern Syria, administratively part of the Jableh District in Latakia Governorate. According to the Syria Central Bureau of Statistics (CBS), Halbakko had a population of 292 in the 2004 census. Its inhabitants are Alawites. The village was originally founded by the residents of nearby Beit Yashout as a forested outpost on the hill above their village. It has an elevation of 1,000 meters (3,300 ft) above sea level. It was among the Alawite villages that revolted or resisted Ottoman authority in the period immediately following the Ottoman conquest of Syria in 1517. By 1547, the village was recorded to have paid 300 dirhems or piasters and its inhabitants were classified as part of the Alawite Kalbiyya tribal confederation.

== Sources ==
- Winter, Stefan (2016). A History of the 'Alawis: From Medieval Aleppo to the Turkish Republic. Princeton and Oxford: Princeton University Press. ISBN 9780691167787.
