= Qurfays =

Qurfays قرفيص Qorfeis
- Village
- Location within Syria
- Coordinates: 35°15′59″N 35°59′19″E
- Country: Syria
- Governorate: Latakia
- District: Jableh
- Subdistrict: al-Qutailibiyah

Population (2004)
  - Total: 799
- Time zone: UTC+2 (EET)
  - Summer (DST): UTC+3 (EEST)

Qurfays (Arabic: قرفيص, also spelled Qurfeis or Korfeis) is a village in northwestern Syria, administratively part of the Jableh District in the Latakia Governorate, located south of Latakia. Nearby localities include Arab al-Mulk to the west, Jableh to the northwest, al-Aqibah and al-Qutailibiyah to the northeast, Sarabion and Dweir Baabda to the southeast. According to the Syria Central Bureau of Statistics, Qurfays had a population of 5,566 in the 2004 census. Its inhabitants are predominantly Alawites and is one of the centers of the large Douba family. Ali Douba, the former longtime Chief of Military Intelligence.

The municipality of Qurfays was established in 1979 to administer the local affairs of the village as well as nearby al-Barazin, al-Zahra, Bishnana and Mahwarta. There are about 7,000 people living in the municipality whose mayor in 2008 was Abdullah Ehsan.

== History ==
Qurfays served as minor fortress village under the authority of the Knights Hospitallers fortress of Margat in the 13th-century and was referred to as Corveis. In 1271 the Mamluk sultan Baibars defeated the Crusaders in the coastal mountain range of Syria and forced the Hospitallers to evacuate Qurfays, among other fortresses. However, before they withdrew, they destroyed Qurfays and nearby Balda. In the 1281 treaty between Mamluk sultan Qalawun and the Crusader king Bohemond IV of Antioch, Qurfays was among the many fortresses officially handed to the Mamluks.

== Bibliography ==
- Batatu, Hanna (1999). Syria's Peasantry, the Descendants of Its Lesser Rural Notables, and Their Politics. Princeton University Press. ISBN 0691002541.
- Bronstein, Judith (2005). The Hospitallers And The Holy Land: Financing The Latin East, 1187-1274. Boydell Press. ISBN 1843831317.
- Holt, Peter Malcolm (1995). Early Mamluk Diplomacy, 1260-1290: Treaties of Baybars and Qalāwūn with Christian Rulers. BRILL. pp. 149–150. ISBN 9004102469.
- Riley-Smith, Jonathan (2012). The Knights Hospitaller in the Levant, C.1070-1309. Palgrave Macmillan. ISBN 978-0230290839.
