= Destruction layer =

Archaeological stratum showing evidence of violent or catastrophic destruction

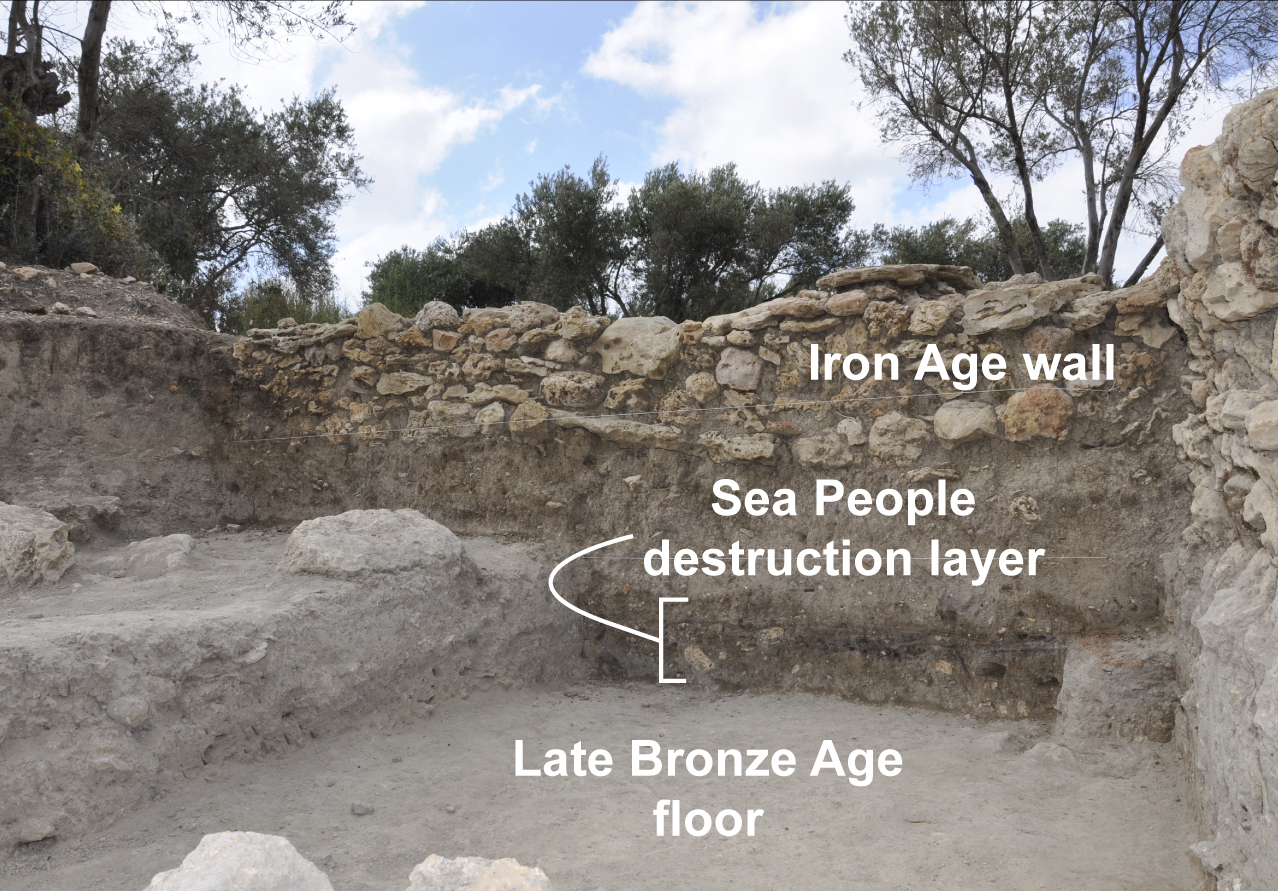
A destruction layer at Tell Tweini, Syria

A destruction layer is an archaeological stratum showing clear evidence of widespread burning, structural collapse, weapon finds, human remains, or other signs of violent or catastrophic events. Such layers may result from warfare, seismic activity, accidental fires, or other disasters.

In archaeological interpretation, destruction horizons provide chronological anchors for cultural sequences and may indicate major historical turning points, such as the fall of cities, regional crises, or the collapse of polities. Finding comparable destruction layers across several sites in a region can signal a broader episode of unrest or transition, as in the case of the Late Bronze Age collapse.

The archaeologist Sharon Zuckerman emphasized that destruction contexts should be analyzed together with the occupational phases preceding and following them, as part of a long-term cultural process rather than isolated events.

== Examples ==
- The city of Troy shows several destruction layers, notably Troy II (c. 2200 BC) and Troy VIIa (c. 1200 BC), the latter often associated with the end of the Late Bronze Age and possibly reflecting conflict in the region.
- The volcanic eruption of Thera (Santorini) produced a well-preserved destruction layer at Akrotiri, dated to the late 17th century BC.
- The Late Bronze Age cities of the Levant, including Hazor, Megiddo, and Lachish, exhibit destruction horizons dated to the 13th–12th centuries BC, often linked to regional instability and the decline of Canaanite urban culture.
- In Anatolia, the Hittite capital of Hattusa was destroyed around 1200 BC, marking the end of the Hittite Empire.
- Destruction layers are also prominent in the Biblical archaeology of the southern Levant, serving as chronological markers for periods of urban transition and political upheaval.

== See also ==
- Stratigraphy (archaeology)
- Archaeological horizon
- Cultural layer
- Bronze Age collapse
