= Arab al-Mulk =

Arab al-Mulk عرب الملك Beldi al-Melek
- Village
- Location within Syria
- Coordinates: 35°16′2″N 35°55′32″E
- Country: Syria
- Governorate: Latakia Governorate
- District: Jableh District
- Nahiyah: Jableh

Population (2004 census)
  - Total: 3,580
- Time zone: UTC+2 (EET)
  - Summer (DST): UTC+3 (EEST)

Arab al-Mulk (Arabic: عرب الملك, also spelled Arab al-Milk, Beldi al-Melek, Balda al-Milk or Beldeh) is a coastal village in northwestern Syria, administratively part of the Jableh District in the Latakia Governorate, located south of Latakia. Nearby localities include Jableh to the north, Ayn al-Sharqiyah to the northeast, Qurfays and Dweir Baabda to the east and Baniyas to the south. According to the Syria Central Bureau of Statistics, Arab al-Mulk had a population of 3,580 in the 2004 census. The inhabitants are mixed, with Sunni Muslims of Bedouin origins generally residing in the northern part of the village, and Alawites living in the southern part which is known as Beldi al-Melek.

== Geography ==
It is situated off the Mediterranean coast, on the right bank of the Sinn tributary (Nahr as-Sinn) as it empties into the sea. It occupies a small peninsula. The southern part of the village on the left bank is known as Beldi al-Melek. To the immediate northwest of the village is a small creek that measures around 110 meters long and 60 meters wide.

== History ==
=== Hellenistic era and Antiquity ===
Arab al-Mulk is the site of the ancient Phoenician settlement of Paltos. The ancient town is believed to have existed between the 6th-5th centuries BCE, as indicated by its mention in the dithyrambs of Greek writer Simonides of Keos. Simonides claimed Memnon was buried near Paltos. It came under Seleucid control by the 1st century BCE. The town prospered in this era, known as the Late Hellenistic Period. Excavations at the site carried out in 1958 reveal a lengthy period, between the 5th and 1st centuries BCE, where there was no settlement activity in the northern Arab al-Mulk part of the village.

Paltos later served as a military camp for Gaius Cassius Longinus during the period in which it was part of the province of Syria. The town is mentioned by Greek geographer Strabo in the last quarter of the 1st century BCE as a coastal town of the Aradians and was later mentioned as one of the cities of Syria. When the Province of Syria was divided into Syria Prima and Phoenicia in 194 CE, Paltos marked the border between the two and was included in Syria Prima.

As the center of influence along the coast began to shift northward during the 2nd century, it is possible that Paltos experienced a recessionary period between the 3rd and 4th centuries. Under the Severan administration in Rome, coins were minted in the town. Bronze coins found in the village in the late 1950s by a Danish expedition included those minted under Constantius II (336-361), Arcadius (395-408) and Justinian I (527-565.) Paltos continued to be inhabited and began to prosper throughout the late Roman rule and during the Byzantine era (5th-6th centuries CE). It had a Christian community, possibly contained a basilica church, and served as a diocese (bishop's seat) during Byzantine rule. In 528 Paltos, along with Gabla and Laodicea, formed part of the Theodorias Province, with Laodicea as capital.

=== Islamic and Crusader era ===
During the Muslim conquest of Syria, in the 630s, the Arab general Ubadah ibn As-Samit conquered Paltos and soon after the town "fell into ruin", as stated by medieval Syrian geographer Yaqut al-Hamawi who visited the site in 1229. The inhabitants were thereafter transferred to other localities. The Umayyad leader Mu'awiya utilized building materials from Paltos to reconstruct nearby Jableh.

Settlement activity ceased from the time of the Muslim conquest until the period between the 9th and 11th centuries. The ruins of a fortified tower dating to the 11th century are located in the Beldi al-Melek part of the village, suggesting a Crusader presence. According to Syrian history expert Warwick Ball, the Crusaders built a small fort on the site. This castle was acquired by the Knights Hospitaller in the 1160s. They referred to it as Belda or Beaude. The fort became part of the Hospitaller stronghold of Margat, along with the castles of Baarin and Qorfeis. In 1271 the Mamluks under the leadership of Sultan Baibars gained control of Belda and its territories soon after the Crusader garrison at the Krak des Chevaliers fortress was defeated.

=== Modern era ===
The modern locality receives its name ′Arab al-Mulk as a result of its settlement by Bedouin ('Arab) and the likelihood that the village was part of the imperial holdings (mulk) of various Ottoman sultans (16th-early 20th centuries) who owned vast swathes of territory along the Syrian coastline. The names roughly translate as follows: Arab al-Mulk being "Arabs of the royal demesne" and Balda al-Mulk being "Balda the royal demesne", Balda being the Arabic version of the Greek Paltos. In the late 19th-century the part of Arab al-Mulk south of the al-Sinn tributary was marked by the vast ruins of Paltos, while just north of the stream stood a large caravanserai (khan). The ruins of minor medieval fortifications at the Balda al-Mulk neighborhood were noted by travelers. A number of Circassian Bzhedug refugees were settled in Arab al-Mulk in 1878, though many would later move further in-land.

== Bibliography ==
- Baedeker, Karl (1876). Palestine and Syria, Handbook for Travellers. Vol. 1. Karl Baedeker.
- Ball, Warwick (2007). Syria: A Historical and Architectural Guide. Interlink Books. ISBN 978-1566566650. "Paltos."
- Riley-Smith, Jonathan (2012). The Knights Hospitaller in the Levant, c.1070-1309. Palgrave Macmillan. ISBN 978-0230290839.
- Royal Danish Academy of Sciences and Letters (2004). Historisk-filosofiske Skrifter. Vol. 28. Kgl. Danske Videnskabernes Selskab. ISBN 8778763673.
- le Strange, Guy (1890). Palestine Under the Moslems: A Description of Syria and the Holy Land from A.D. 650 to 1500. Committee of the Palestine Exploration Fund. p. 493. "Lajjun Guy le Strange."
