= Tell Sukas =

Archaeological site in Syria

- Shuksi, Suksi
- Location within Syria
- 35.306318°N 35.922203°E
- Type: Tell
- Periods: Late Bronze Age, Iron Age
- Location: near Jableh, Syria
- Region: Levant
- Part of: Town

History
- Abandoned: c. 69 BC

Site notes
- Material: Clay, Limestone
- Area: 1.9 hectares (200,000 ft^{2})
- Excavation dates: 1934, 1958–1961, 1963
- Archaeologists: Emil Forrer, P.J. Riis
- Condition: Ruins
- Management: Directorate-General of Antiquities and Museums
- Public access: Yes

Tell Sukas (also "Teil Sukäs" and "Tell Soukas") (possibly ancient Shuksi or Suksi) is a Late Bronze Age archaeological mound on the Eastern Mediterranean coast about 6 kilometers south of modern Jableh, Syria. It lies about 5 kilometers to the south of Tell Tweini which has been one of the sites proposed as ancient Gibala. The site of Qalat Er-Rouss is a further 9 kilometers to the north. The site of Tell Daruk is not far to the south.

== History ==
=== Neolithic Chalcolithic and Early Bronze Ages ===
Based on a single deep but narrow sondage the site was occupied in the Neolithic, Chacolithic, and Early Bronze Ages but little can be said of the form of occupation. There was a hiatus of occupation after the Neolithic period with settlement returning in the Late Chalcolithic period. These findings were supported by a number of radiocarbon dates.

== Middle Bronze Age ==
The most prominent feature of the Middle Bronze Age was a large collective tomb (Tomb IV) with three burial layers. It held 41 individuals "dis-articulated skeletal components which had been subject to secondary treatment". With the poor state of preservation and damaged from construction in later periods along with the excavator's focus on the Iron Age, little be determined about the buildings associated with the tomb.

=== Late Bronze Age ===
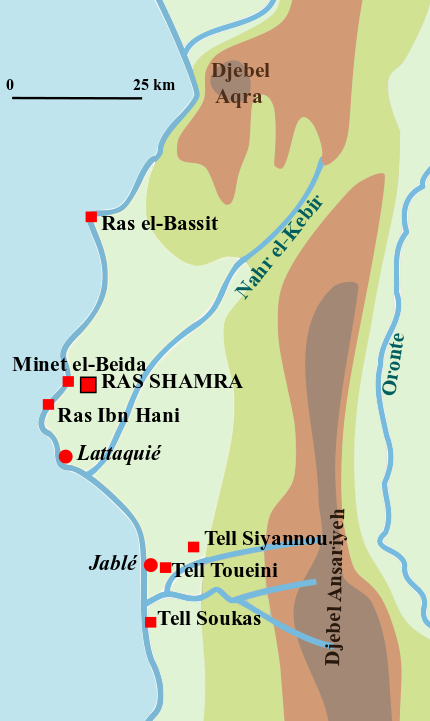
Kingdom of Ugarit

The site is generally identified as ancient Suksi, which was mentioned in the Ugarit tablets. It was part of Siyannu-Ušhnatu which was the next kingdom to the south below that of Ugarit. An ash layer was interpreted by the excavators as a destruction by violent conflagration c. 1170 BC like other coastal Mediterranean sites including Tell Tweini and Ugarit to the north. Unlike those it does not enter a period of abandonment afterward.

=== Iron Age ===
The site was reused shortly thereafter and commercial activity at the Iron Age settlement can be traced again to at least the tenth century BC, when it became the port of Luhuti,

==== Phoenician and Greek settlement ====
The Phoenician coastal settlement, divided into two phases (Phoenician II and I). Archaeological evidence points to strong trade connections with Cyprus and the Aegean, as shown by imported Greek and Cypriot pottery.

Archaeological findings indicate that the Greeks established a settlement at Tell Sukas at approximately the same time they arrived at Al-Mina, the town thrived as a Greek trading outpost until c. 498 BC. Multiple regional conflicts in the 6th century BC and the early 5th century BC contributed to the eventual abandonment of the Greek settlement. Like Al-Mina, Tell Sukas served as a port that likely enabled transplanted Greeks to engage in trade with both fellow Greeks and the local inhabitants. Greek settlers established themselves at Tell Sukas alongside Cypriots.

=== Neo-Phoenician and Hellenistic Periods ===
The site was largely abandoned after the destruction of the Greek settlement (around 498 BC) and was later reoccupied by Phoenicians between about 380 and 140 BC. Later Hellenistic phases were destroyed by earthquakes.

=== Roman, Byzantine and Medieval Periods ===
The Byzantines transformed the mound into a fortress, which was later expanded by the Crusaders, occupied by Muslim forces and abandoned in the 14th century.

== Archeology ==
Tell Sukas consists of a central main mound that overlooks natural harbors to the north and south. On the far shore of the southern harbor there is an outdoor sanctuary, Mīna Sūkās dedicated to a local god, which has been excavated.

The site of Tell Sukas was first worked by Emil Forrer who conducted two soundings in 1934 as part of the Bryn Mawr College expedition to Cilicia with most of the finds sent to Bryn Mawr. One trench which ran 7.35 meters deep found seven occupational layers with layer 5 subdivided into three levels. A two meter square test pit was also dig. The excavator identified Tell Sukas as the site of ancient Gibala (later on others suggested Tell Tweini as Gibala). No formal report of the work was published.

The site was excavated in 1958–1961 and again in 1963 by the Danish Carlsberg Expedition to Phoenicia under P.J. Riis. Finds included one alphabetic cuneiform tablet (KTU3 4.766, 67 x 89 x 29 mm, now held at the National Museum of Syria in Damascus). The text was administrative, containing a list of payments to military persons, in the Ugaritic language, and on its edge read "belonged to the House of the King". Evidence of Neolithic, Chacolithic, Early Bronze occupation was only found in a single deep sounding (15 meters deep, 4 meters by 4 meters at the top, 2.5 meters by 2.7 meters at the bottom). The excavations primary focus was on Iron Age and later so the Middle and Late Bronze periods received less attention. A steatite cylinder seal depicted an archer mounted on a chariot, drawing his bow. A voluted tree precedes the chariot and a taller man walks behind it. The seal was found out of context.

Excavations uncovered an early Iron Age cemetery south of the tell which was dated to between the 13th and 10th century BC. Excavations also uncovered a large seventh-century Phoenician temple. The abundance of Greek pottery and the discovery of Greek burial grounds suggest that the city became a permanent Hellenic outpost by 600 BC. The earliest Greek type tombs discovered date to the late seventh century BC. Despite interruptions caused by destructive events around 588 and again in 552 BC, the period from approximately 675 to at least 498 BC reveals distinctly Greek elements, such as a sanctuary built in Greek architectural style, which differed from typical Syro-Phoenician religious structures.
