= Nahr as-Sinn =

Coordinates: 35°15′50.54″N 35°55′33.13″E

Nahr as-Sinn Arabic: نهر السن

Location
- Country: Syria

Physical characteristics
- Source: Syrian Coastal Mountain Range
  - location: Tartus Governorate, Syria
  - elevation: 11 m (36 ft)
- Mouth: south of Arab al-Mulk
- Length: 6 km (3.7 mi)
- Basin size: 44.4 km^{2} (17.1 sq mi)
- Discharge
  - average: 13 m^{3}/s (460 cu ft/s)

Nahr as-Sinn (Arabic: نهر السن) is a river in Syria which marks the borders between Tartus Governorate and Latakia Governorate.

== History ==
In ancient times, the river was called "Siyannu" which marked the southern borders of Ugarit.

== Course ==
Nahr as-Sinn rises in a plain area in Tartus Governorate and runs to the west to finally flow into the Mediterranean Sea south of Arab al-Mulk. Despite its length which is only 6 kilometres (3.7 mi), it is considered the richest river in Syria.

== See also ==
- Siyannu
