= Sondage =

Archaeological process

A sondage is an archaeological process to clarify stratigraphic sequences during preliminary investigations of the terrain prior to an archaeological dig. In a narrower sense it is a "deep trial trench for inspecting stratigraphy".

In doing so, several approximately 1 m^{2} (11 sq ft) test excavations are carried out over the area, as far as possible down to the 'natural soil' level. Clearly recognizable layers of sediment (possibly created by hiatuses or fire horizons) allow an initial overview, and individual finds made in the process can be assigned to a specific layer in suitable cases. In the case of a probe, technical work steps such as the precise measurement of the cut are particularly important.

In a figurative sense, a survey procedure is also called a sondage.
