= Tell Tweini =

Archaeological tell in northwest Syria

- Gibala
- Location within Syria
- 35°22′18″N 35°56′11″E
- Type: Settlement
- Periods: Bronze Age, Iron Age, Hellenistic period
- Location: Latakia Governorate, Syria
- Region: Levant

Site notes
- Excavation dates: 1999-2010
- Archaeologists: Michel al-Maqdissi, Joachim Bretschneider, Karel Van Lerberghe
- Condition: In ruins

Tell Tweini, (also Tell Toueini (alternately Tell at-Toueni), both transliterations of the Arabic تل تويني) possibly the ancient town of Gibala, is a 12 hectare archaeological site, located 1 kilometer east of the modern Jableh and 30 kilometers south of modern Lattakia, in Latakia Governorate, Syria. It is situated within the coastal plain of Jableh, a short distance of two other main archaeological sites: Tell Sukas (5 km) and Tell Siyannu (6 km). As a tell, the site is the result of centuries of habitation on the same place, which resulted in a rising mound, as every new generation built their houses on top of the remains of older structures. The tell is sited about 1.7 kilometers from the coast and it was earlier proposed that in the Bronze Age a sea incursion provided a harbor access to the sea. Later geomorphological research has refuted this.

== Gibala ==
The city of Gibala, proposed as the identification of Tell Tweini, is known only from Late Bronze Age texts of Ugarit. It, along with Suksi, thought to be at Tell Sukas, were the two southernmost seaports in the Late Bronze kingdom of Ugarit (though Suksi may have been under the control of Sianu-Ushnatu at some point). They were just above the border with the Sianu-Ushnatu double kingdom to the south. Sianu has been proposed as being at the site of Tell Sianu however no Late Bronze remains were found during excavation so nearby Tell Iris is now being considered instead. Like Ugarit all these sites faced destruction c. 1200 BC. Given no epigraphy has been found at Tell Tweini the proposed identification as Gibala is based solely on its size, occupation levels, and general location. Gibala is also mentioned in Akkadian language texts, as "Gi_{5}-bá-la", PRU 4, 71–76 and PRU 5, 74 which is a treaty between Ugarit ruler Niqmepa and Sianu ruler Abdi’anat after the transfer of Ugarit vassalage from Egypt to the Hittite Empire (via its viceroy at Karkemish). It has been suggested that Gibala was also mentioned in a later text of Neo-Assyrian ruler Tiglat-pileser III (744-727 BC).

== History ==
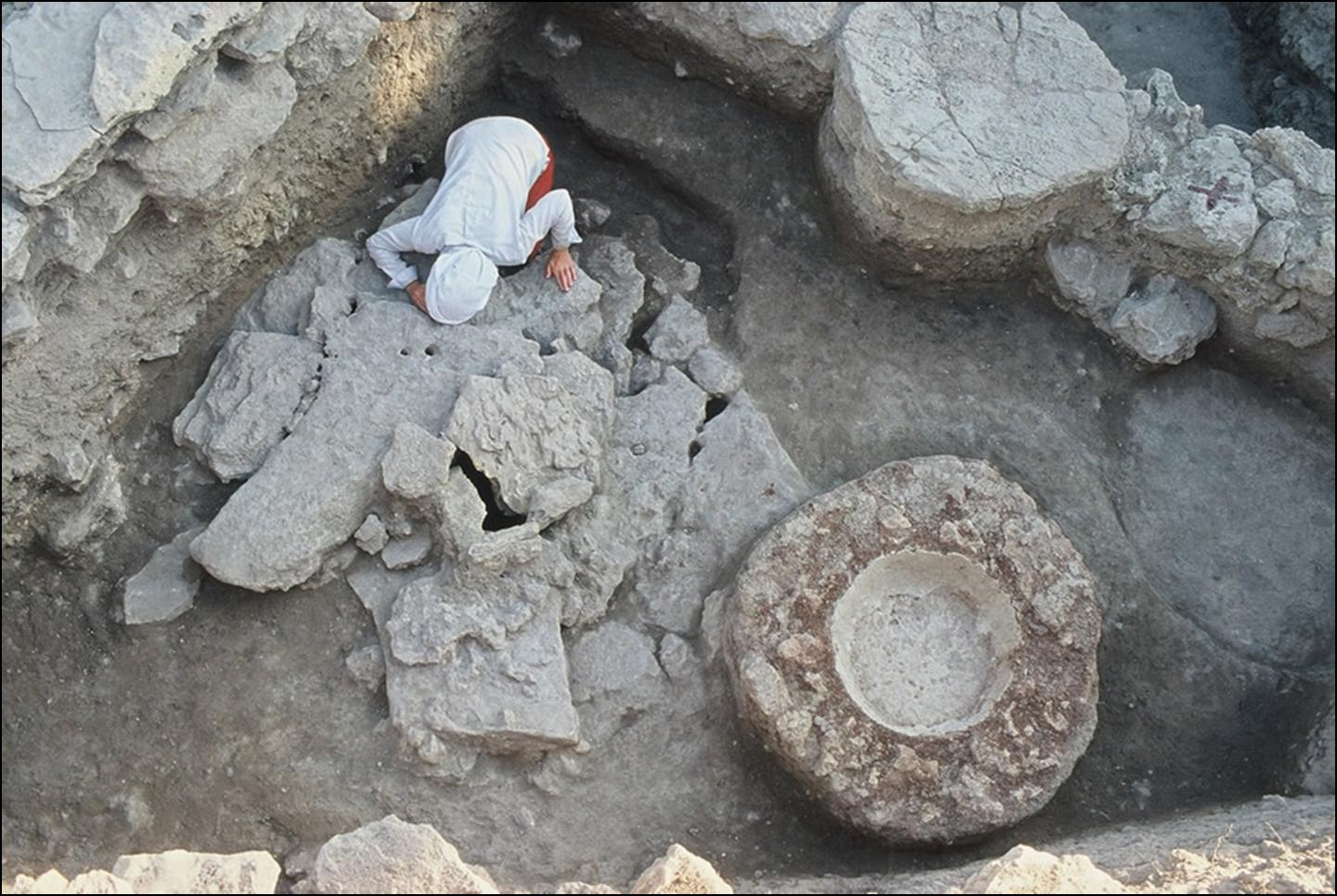
Collective tomb from the Middle Bronze Age before opening

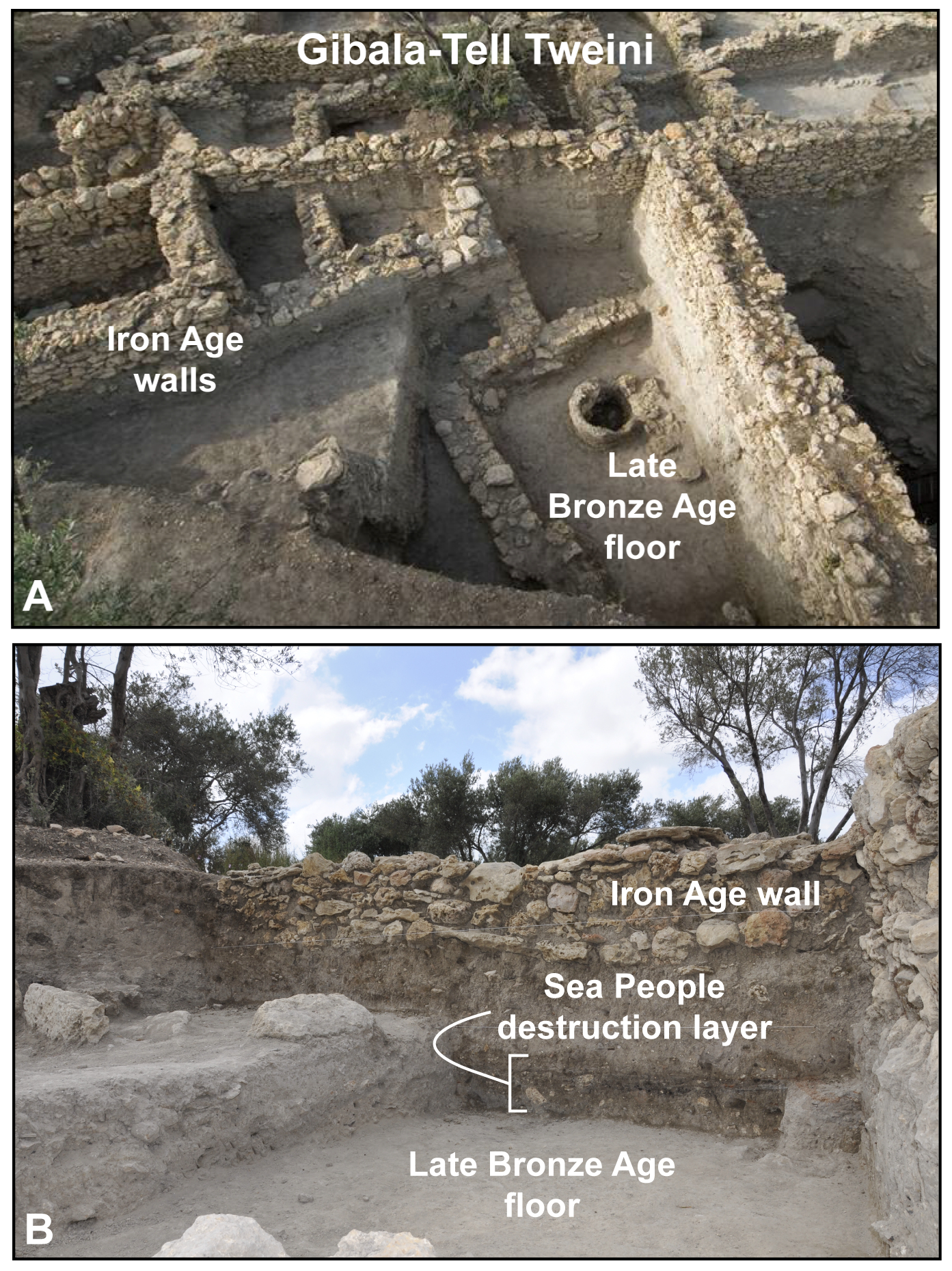
Harbour town Gibala-Tell Tweini and the Sea People destruction layer.

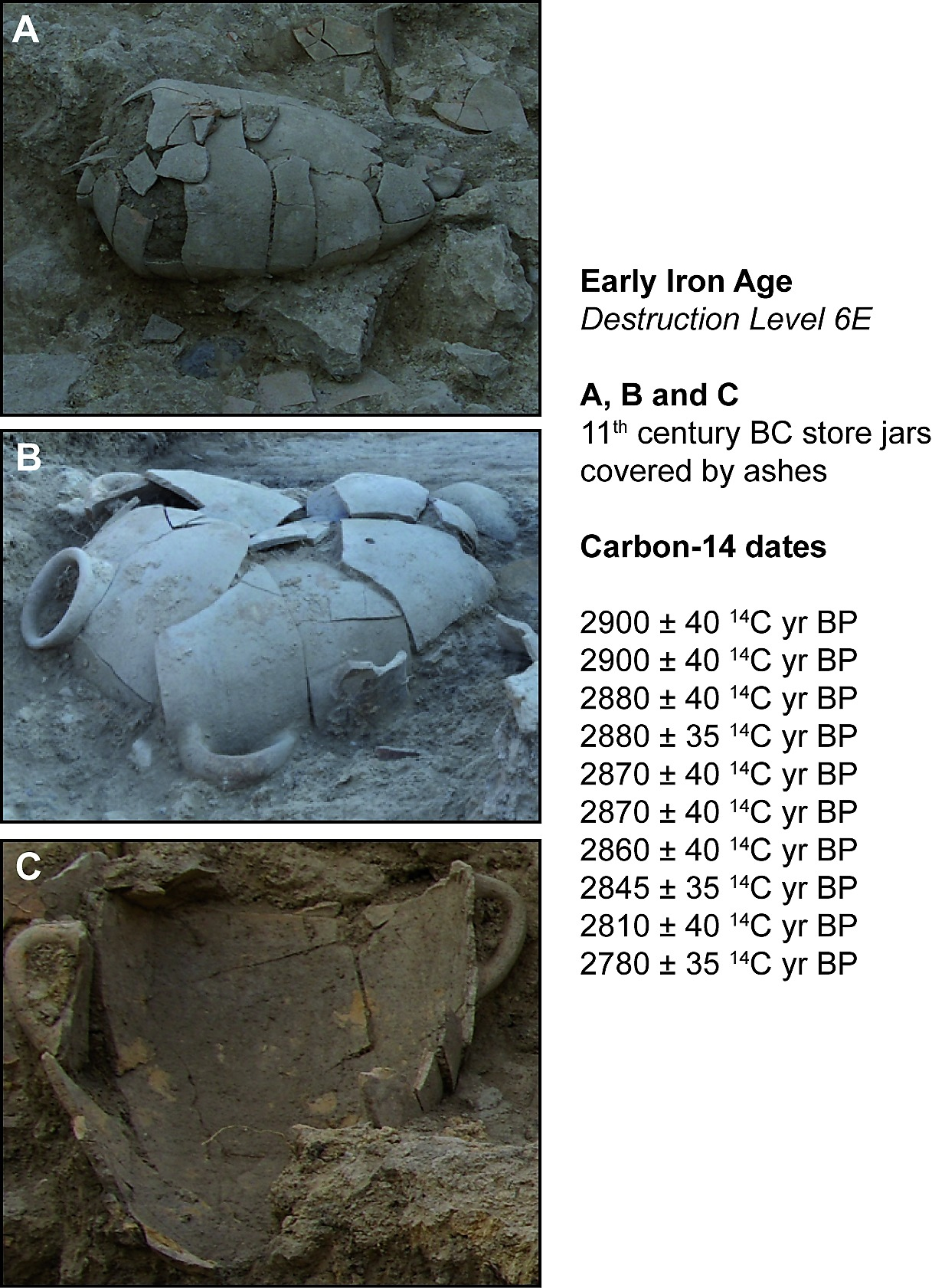
Gibala-Tell Tweini. Storage jars found in the Early Iron Age destruction layer. The carbon-14 dating results provide a chronological framework for the Early Iron Age in the Northern Levant.

Tell Tweini was inhabited from at least the end of the third millennium BCE until the Persian period.

=== Middle Bronze Age ===
An extraordinary find at Tell Tweini was the communal tomb dating to ca 1700 BCE.

The grave contained the skeletons of 42 adults and 16 infants. Serving as grave-goods were 160 well-preserved ceramic vessels, plates and dishes, several bronze pins and a figurine. .. Among others, the grave goods included a fenestrated axe, quite typical for this period. Similar axes have also been discovered at Sukas, Ugarit and Byblos.

=== Late Bronze Age ===
At the end of the Late Bronze Age Gibala formed the southern border of the Ugaritic kingdom. The transition between the Late Bronze Age and Iron Age remains one of the most poorly understood aspects of the most northern Levantine site, but preliminary results from the end of the 2007 campaign show that the city was inhabited during the 11th-10th century BCE. During the Iron Age, the city was completely urbanised. Geophysical prospecting conducted on the complete surface of the tell demonstrated this and made it possible to detect the ancient street system of the Iron Age city. By the Persian era the city had lost its importance and the habitation was relocated near to the modern harbour of Jebleh at the Mediterranean sea coast. Later, during the Byzantine domination of the region, some isolated structures were installed on the surface of the tell.

== Archaeology ==
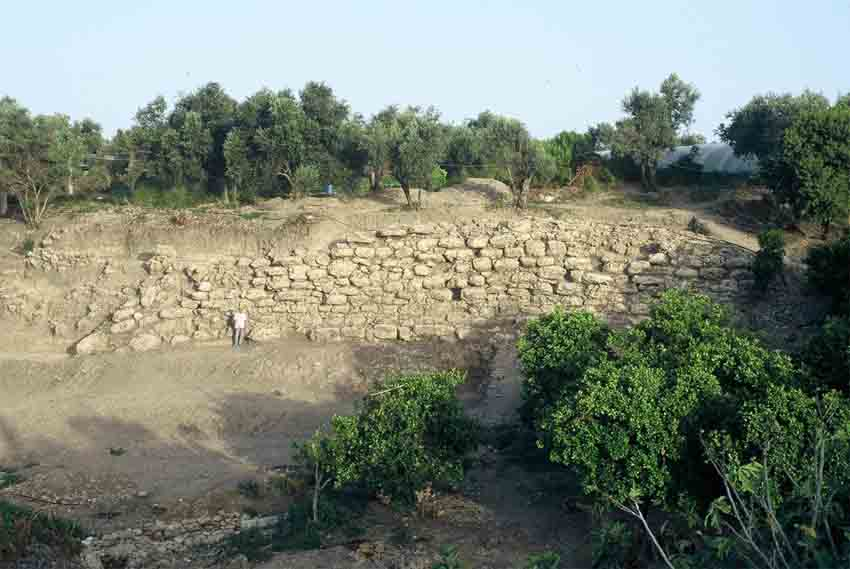
City wall of Tell Tweini

The site consists of a tell, 350 meters by 290 meters (about 11.7 hectares in area), with a height 15–20 meters above the surrounding plain.

Beginning in 1999, Tell Tweini was investigated by a Syro-Belgian interdisciplinary team led by Michel al-Maqdissi, Joachim Bretschneider and Karel Van Lerberghe. The Syrian team worked in Field B while the Belgian team worked in Fields A and C. Major discoveries include a Phoenician sanctuary, a large city wall, several domestic and public structures from the Iron Age I-II and multiple small finds. A number of Middle Bronze Age burials, almost all undisturbed, were excavated including jar, beehive, chambered, and simple inhumations, many in an intramural context. A large communal tomb from the end of the Middle Bronze Age containing 58 human remains was found. Grave goods included "bronze ornaments, jewellery, a fenestrated bronze axe (duckbill variety), figurines, numerous red and black slipped juglets, Syro-Cilician ware vases and Cypriote White Painted jugs".

Excavations ended in 2010, interrupted by of local condition but work on the findings continue. Finds from the site included cylinder seals, stamp seals, and clay sealings. A high quality 13th century BC Middle Assyrian quartzite cylinder seal (3.5 cm in height, 1.5 cm in diameter) was found as a floor deposit on a Level 6 A/B level (Iron Age II) layer, suggesting that it was an heirloom. The iconography was a fairly typical hero fighting a winged horse and it has been suggested that it dates to the reign of Tukulti-Ninurta. Pottery recovered included Kamares ware, produced in Crete between c. 2100 BC and c. 1450 BC. Eleven burials were excavated, nine from the Bronze Age (single, double and collective burials in jar, structural tombs and earth tombs) and two from the Iron Age.

Tell Tweini is the only site in the region that has been excavated at all levels from the Early Bronze period until modern times. Excavators have specified an occupational stratigraphy (the site was destroyed by conflagration at the end of Level 7A and again, after partial reoccupation, before Level 6 c. 1000 BC with radiocarbon dates of 3000–2870 BC and 1000–845 BC determined) is close to the AMS 14C age obtained at the bottom of the TW-2 core (), which dates a high accumulation of charred plant remains. The conflagration of the site:

- Level 9 A/B - Early Bronze Age IV
- Level 8 D/E - Middle Bronze Age I
- Level 8 C/D - Middle Bronze Age II
- Level 8 A - Middle Bronze Age II to Late Bronze Age I transition
- Level 7 D/E - Late Bronze Age I
- Level 7 B/C - Late Bronze Age II
- Level 7 A - Late Bronze Age II - Iron Age I transition
- Level 6 D/C - - Iron Age I
- Level 6 A/B - Iron Age II
- Level 5 A/B - Iron Age II
- Level 4 A/B - Iron Age III
- Level 3 - Hellenistic/Roman
- Level 2 - Byzantine/Islamic
- Level 1 - Modern

Note that different excavation documents give slightly varying stratigraphy, mainly in the Iron Age.

A number of copper alloy artifacts from various periods were found. Lead isotope analysis determined that in those dating from before the c. 1200 BC destruction layer the copper were sourced from the area of Cyprus and in those afterward from locations in Turkey and Jordan.

== Diet ==
A study on the diet of the Bronze inhabitants of Tell Tweini reveals that their diet was similar to the modern Mediterranean diet, primarily consisting of grains, grapes, olives, and small amounts of meat and dairy. Archaeologists from the University of Leuven and the University of Tübingen used isotopic analysis on various remains to understand the food chain and agricultural practices of that time. The findings indicate that during the Middle Bronze Age (2000 to 1600 BC), the local diet was mainly composed of plant-based foods. However, the presence of sheep, goats, and cattle remains suggests that meat and dairy were also part of their diet, albeit occasionally. While fish made up only a few percent of the diet at the site a large percentage were Nile perch (Lates niloticus), imported from Egypt. Nile perch made up 40% of the identified fish bones recovered by the excavators in the Middle Bronze Age, 60% in the Late Bronze Age and 80% in the Iron Age layers.

== See also ==
- Short chronology timeline - one of the chronologies of the Near Eastern Bronze and Early Iron Age
- Cities of the ancient Near East
