= Mount Nabi Yunis, Syria =

Mountain in Syria

Mount Nabi Yunis
- Location within Syria

Highest point
- Elevation: 1,568 m (5,144 ft)
- Coordinates: 35°38′25″N 36°13′1″E

Geography
- Location: Latakia Governorate, Syria
- Parent range: Syrian Coastal Mountain Range (Jabal Ansariya)

Mount Nabi Yunis (Arabic: جبل النبي يونس, romanized: Jabal Nabī Yūnis) is the highest point of the Syrian Coastal Mountain Range (Jabal Ansariya or the Alawite Mountains) in northwestern Syria, about 40 kilometers (25 mi) east of the Mediterranean port city of Latakia. Its peak is 1,568 meters (5,144 ft) above sea level. Atop the mountain is a maqam (shrine) and both the shrine and the mountain are named after Nabi Yunis (the 'Prophet Jonah'), a popular saintly figure among Alawites.

== Sources ==
- Balanche, Fabrice (2000). "Les Alaouites, l'espace et le pouvoir dans la région côtière syrienne : une intégration nationale ambiguë" (in French). Tours: Université François Rabelais.
- Procházka-Eisl, Gisela; Procházka, Stephan (2010). The Plain of Saints and Prophets: The Nusayri-Alawi Community of Cilicia (Southern Turkey) and Its Sacred Places. Wiesbaden: Harassowitz Verlag. ISBN 978-3-447-06178-0.
