= Harf al-Musaytirah =

Village in Syria

Harf al-Musaytirah حرف المسيترة
- Village
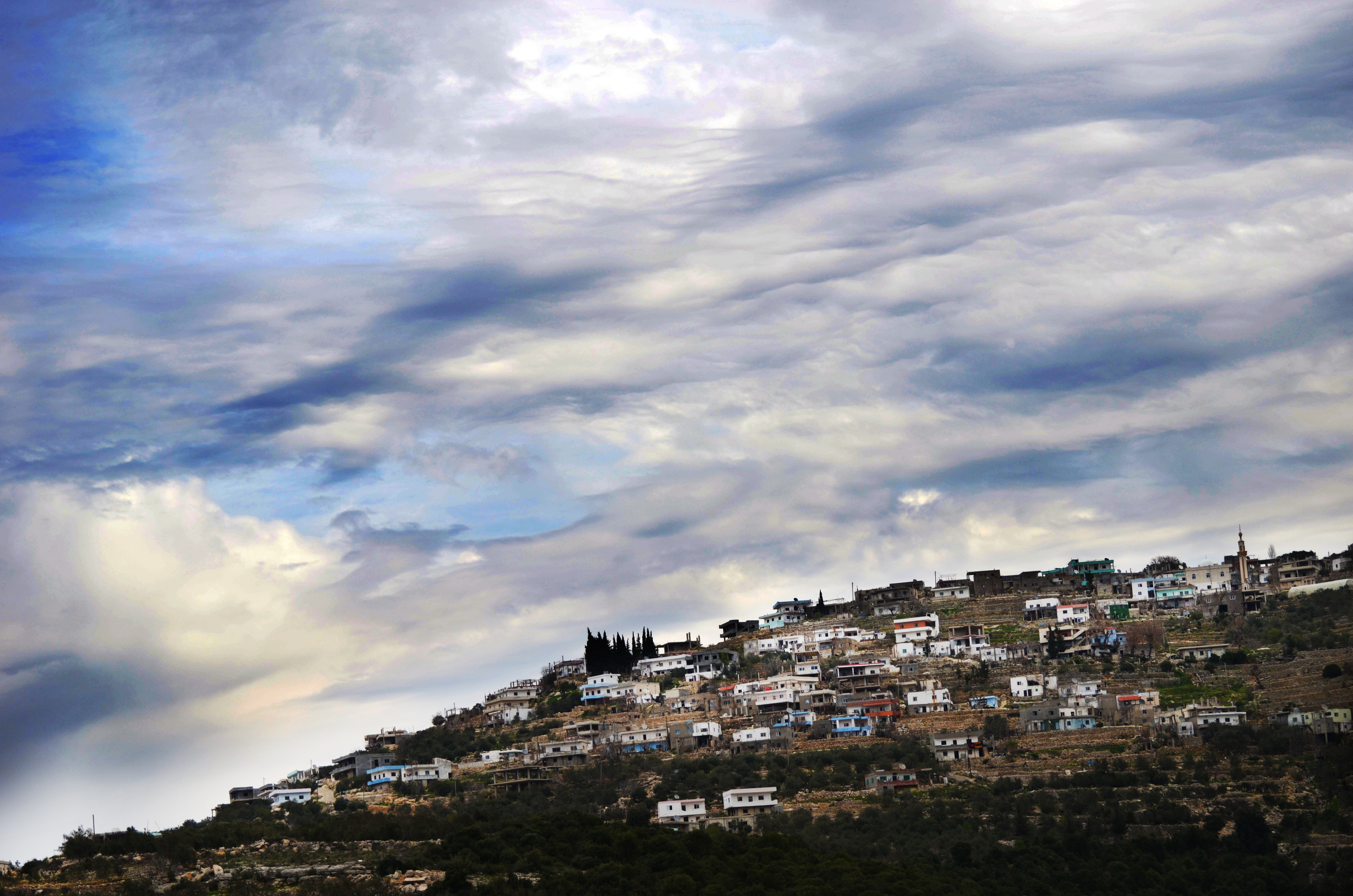
- Harf al-Musaytirah

- Location in Syria
- Coordinates: 35°23′26″N 36°7′57″E
- Country: Syria
- Governorate: Latakia
- District: Qardaha
- Subdistrict: Harf al-Musaytirah

Population (2004)
  - Total: 2,540
- Time zone: UTC+3 (EET)
  - Summer (DST): UTC+2 (EEST)
- City Qrya Pcode: C3829

Harf al-Musaytirah (Arabic: حرف المسيترة) is a Syrian village in the Qardaha District in Latakia Governorate. According to the Syria Central Bureau of Statistics (CBS), Harf al-Musaytirah had a population of 2,540 in the 2004 census.
