= Ayn al-Sharqiyah =

Town in northwestern Syria

Ayn al-Sharqiyah عين الشرقية Ain esh-Sharqiye
- Town
- Location within Syria
- Coordinates: 35°19′55″N 36°5′55″E
- Country: Syria
- Governorate: Latakia
- District: Jableh
- Subdistrict: Ayn al-Sharqiyah

Population (2004)
  - Total: 2,359
- Time zone: UTC+2 (EET)
  - Summer (DST): UTC+3 (EEST)

Ayn al-Sharqiyah (Arabic: عين الشرقية, also spelled Ain esh-Sharqiye) is a town in northwestern Syria, administratively part of the Jableh District in the Latakia Governorate, located southeast of Latakia. Nearby localities include Siyano to the northwest, Zama to the north, Ayn al-Kurum to the northeast, Beit Yashout to the east, Nahr al-Bared to the southeast, Daliyah to the south, Dweir Baabda, Baniyas and Arab al-Mulk to the southwest. According to the Syria Central Bureau of Statistics, Ayn al-Sharqiyah had a population of 2,359 in the 2004 census. It is the administrative center of a nahiyah ("sub-district") containing 22 localities which had a collective population of 16,800 in 2004. Its inhabitants are predominantly Alawites.Until the 1920s, the village had a population of around 25 Greek Orthodox Christian families with the surname Haddad, Touma and Helou. Between 1891 and 1911, they emigrated to Brazil and Argentina.
