= Beit Yashout =

Town in northwestern Syria

Beit Yashout بَيْت يَاشُوط
- Town
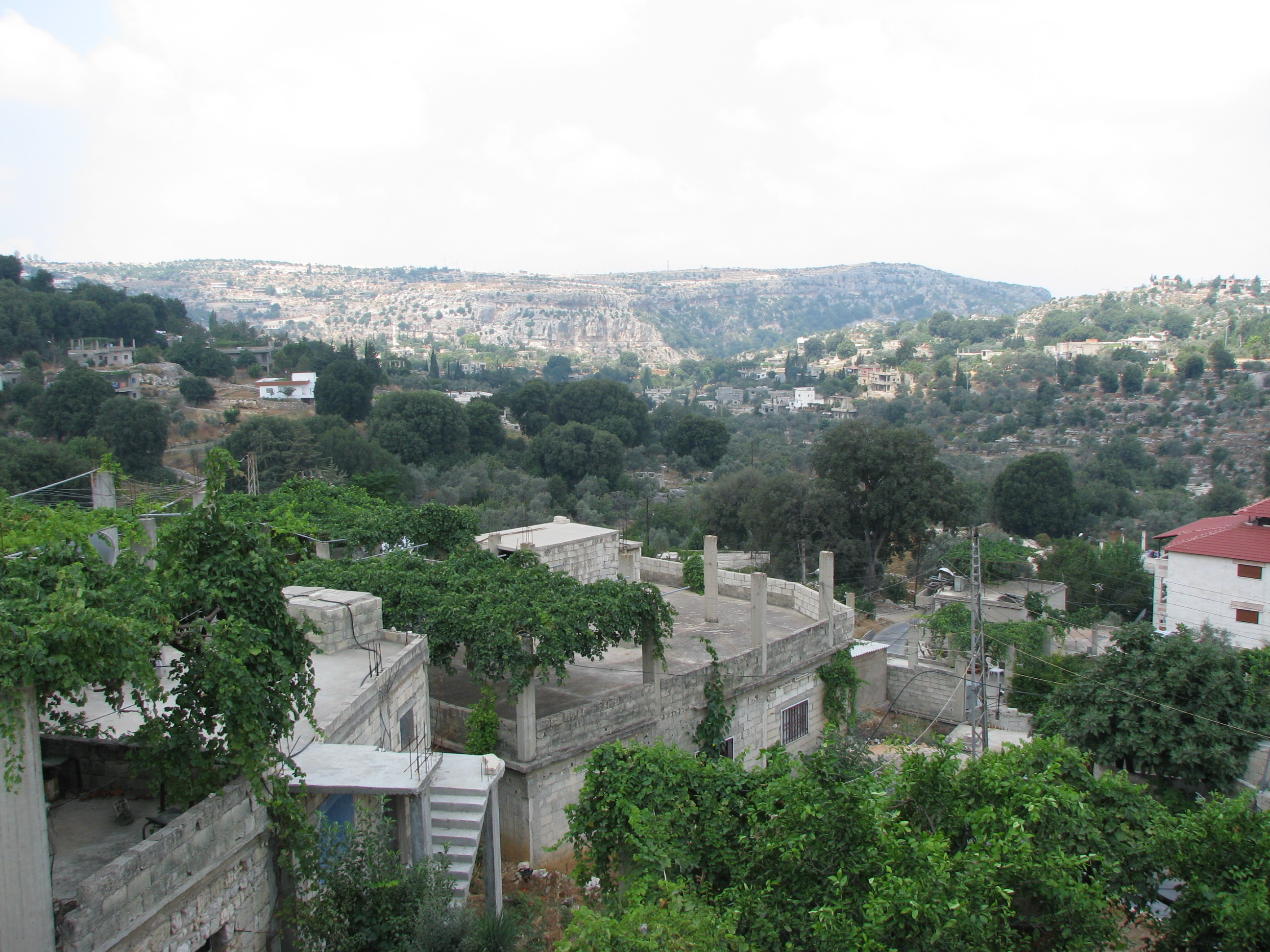
- Beit Yashout

- Location within Syria
- Coordinates: 35°19′1″N 36°7′49″E
- Country: Syria
- Governorate: Latakia
- District: Jableh
- Subdistrict: Beit Yashout
- Elevation: 500 m (1,600 ft)

Population (2004 census)
  - Total: 6,115
- Time zone: UTC+2 (EET)
  - Summer (DST): UTC+3 (EEST)

Beit Yashout (Arabic: بَيْت يَاشُوط, romanized: Bayt Yāshūṭ) is a town in northwestern Syria, administratively part of the Jableh District of the Latakia Governorate, and located south of Latakia. Nearby localities include Ayn al-Sharqiyah to the west and Daliyah to the south. According to the Syria Central Bureau of Statistics, Beit Yashout had a population of 6,115 in the 2004 census. The town is located in the An-Nusayriyah Mountains at an elevation of around 500 m (1,700 ft).

Beit Yashout is one of the villages inhabited by the Alawite Hadadin tribal confederation, to which former first lady Aniseh Makhlouf belonged. Specifically, the village was the traditional home of the Haddadin's Bani Ali clan. Beit Yashout is the hometown of Muhammad al-Khuli, a prominent military official in Baathist governments in the 1960s and throughout former president Hafez al-Assad's time in office (1970–2000).

== See also ==
- Halbakko

== Bibliography ==
- Batatu, Hanna (1999). Syria's Peasantry, the Descendants of Its Lesser Rural Notables, and Their Politics. Princeton University Press. ISBN 0691002541.
- Antoun, Richard T. (1991). Syria: Society, Culture, and Polity. SUNY Press. ISBN 0791407136.
