= Daliyah =

Daliyah الدالية
- Village
- Location in Syria
- Coordinates: 35°14′5″N 36°8′36″E
- Country: Syria
- Governorate: Latakia
- District: Jableh
- Subdistrict: Daliyah

Population (2004)
  - Total: 4,540
- Time zone: UTC+3 (EET)
  - Summer (DST): UTC+2 (EEST)
- City Qrya Pcode: C3651

Daliyah (Arabic: الدالية) is a Syrian village in the Jableh District in the southern part of the Latakia Governorate in western Syria. According to the Syria Central Bureau of Statistics (CBS), Daliyah had a population of 4,540 in the 2004 census.
