= Siyannu =

Siyannu سيانو
- Village
- Location in Syria
- Coordinates: 35°21′55″N 36°0′10″E
- Country: Syria
- Governorate: Latakia
- District: Jableh District
- Subdistrict: Jableh

Population (2004)
  - Total: 4,784
- Time zone: UTC+3 (EET)
  - Summer (DST): UTC+2 (EEST)
- City Qrya Pcode: C3582

Siyannu (Arabic: سيانو) is a Syrian village in Jableh District in Latakia Governorate. According to the Syria Central Bureau of Statistics (CBS), Siyannu had a population of 4,784 in the 2004 census.

== History ==
=== Late Bronze ===
Siyannu (Tell Siyannu), which was also known as Ušnatu, was part of Ugarit, before having its independence and becoming a border region with Amrit during the reign of the Hittite King Muršili II.

=== Iron Age ===
Siyannu/Shianu, led by King Adunu Baal, took part in the Battle of Qarqar against the invading Assyrians.

Nahr as-Sinn was also called "Siyannu" which marked the southern borders of Ugarit.
