= Syrian Coastal Mountain Range =

Mountain range in Syria

- سلسلة الجبال الساحلية
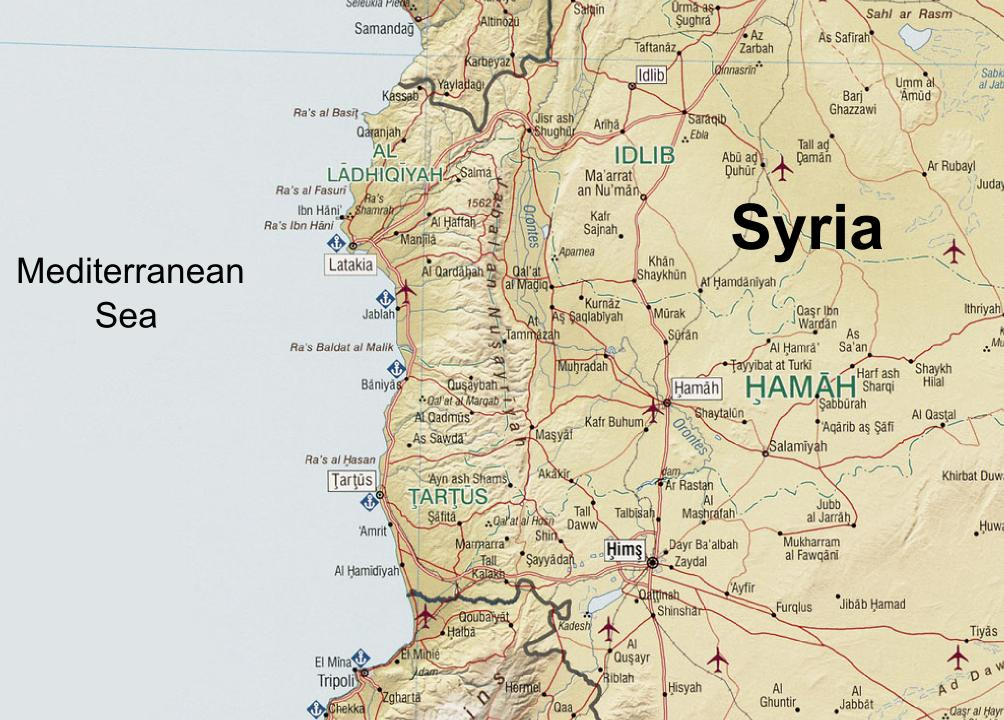
- Coastal Mountain Range

Highest point
- Peak: Nabi Yunis
- Elevation: 1,562 m (5,125 ft)

Dimensions
- Length: 150 km (93 mi)

Geography
- Location: Syria
- Range coordinates: 35.60°N 36.24°E

The Coastal Mountain Range (Arabic: سلسلة الجبال الساحلية, Silsilat al-Jibāl as-Sāḥilīyah), also called Jabal al-Ansariya, Jabal an-Nusayria or Jabal al-`Alawīyin (Ansari, Nusayri or Alawi Mountains), is a mountain range in northwestern Syria running north–south, parallel to the coastal plain. The mountains have an average width of 32 kilometres (20 mi), and their average peak elevation is just over 1,200 metres (3,900 ft) with the highest peak, Nabi Yunis, reaching 1,562 metres (5,125 ft), east of Latakia. In the north the average height declines to 900 metres (3,000 ft), and to 600 metres (2,000 ft) in the south.

This mountain range has been home to an Alawite population since the Middle Ages.

== Name ==
Classically, this range was known as the Bargylus, a name mentioned by Pliny the Elder. The name probably had its roots in the name of an ancient city-kingdom called Barga, located in the vicinity of the mountains; it was a city of the Eblaite Empire in the third millennium BC, and then a vassal kingdom of the Hittites, who named the mountain range after Barga.

In the medieval period they were known as the Jabal Bahra (جبل بهراء) after the Arab tribe of Bahra'. They are also sometimes known as the Nusayriyah Mountains or the Ansarieh Mountains (جبال النصيرية Jibāl an-Nuṣayriyah) or the Alawiyin Mountains (جبال العلويين Jibāl al-‘Alawīyin); both of these names refer to the Alawi ethnoreligious group which has traditionally lived there, though the former term is based on an antiquated label for the community that is now considered insulting.

== Geography ==
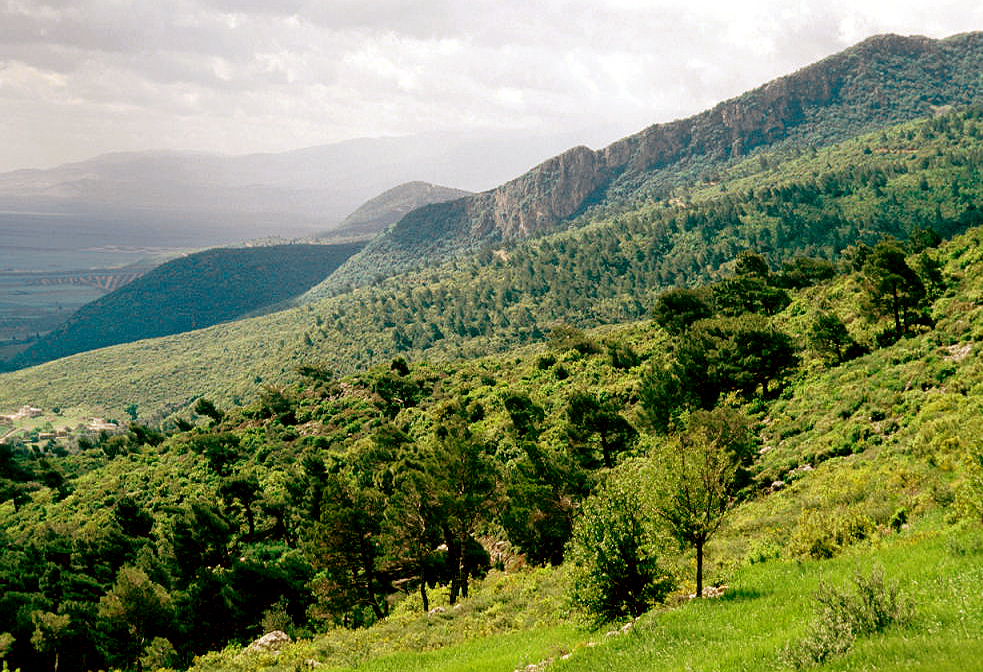
Syrian Coastal Mountains

The western slopes catch moisture-laden winds from the Mediterranean Sea and are thus more fertile and more heavily populated than the eastern slopes. The Orontes River flows north alongside the range on its eastern verge in the Ghab Plain, a 64 kilometres (40 mi) longitudinal trench, and then around the northern edge of the range to flow into the Mediterranean. South of Masyaf there is a large northeast-southwest strike-slip fault which separates An-Nusayriyah Mountain from the coastal Mount Lebanon and the Anti-Lebanon Mountains of Lebanon, in a feature known as the Homs Gap.

Between 1920 and 1936, the mountains formed parts of the eastern border of the Alawite State within the French Mandate for Syria and the Lebanon.

== See also ==
- Turkmen Mountain
- Wildlife of the Levant
- Lake 16 Tishreen
