= Jableh District =

Jableh District منطقة جبلة
- District
- Map of Jableh District within Latakia Governorate
- Coordinates (Jableh): 35°21′35″N 35°55′30″E
- Country: Syria
- Governorate: Latakia
- Seat: Jableh
- Subdistricts: 6 nawāḥī

Area
  - Total: 485.54 km^{2} (187.47 sq mi)

Population (2004)
  - Total: 196,171
  - Density: 404.03/km^{2} (1,046.4/sq mi)
- Geocode: SY0602

Jableh District (Arabic: منطقة جبلة, romanized: manṭiqat Jablah) is a district of the Latakia Governorate in northwestern Syria. Administrative centre is the city of Jableh. At the 2004 census, the district had a population of 196,171.

Agriculture has remained the most important economic sector in the province, with citrus fruits, apples, and olives being the main cash crops. Tourism mostly from the Persian Gulf States is also a major source of income for the inhabitants during the summer season.

== Sub-districts ==
The district of Jableh is divided into six sub-districts or nawāḥī (population as of 2004):

- Jableh Subdistrict (ناحية جبلة): population 107,064.
- Ayn al-Sharqiyah Subdistrict (ناحية عين الشرقية): population 16,800.
- Al-Qutailibiyah Subdistrict (ناحية القطيلبية): population 32,582.
- Ayn Shiqaq Subdistrict (ناحية عين شقاق): population 16,031.
- Daliyah Subdistrict (ناحية دالية): population 13,608.
- Beit Yashout Subdistrict (ناحية بيت ياشوط): population 10,086.
