= Basatin, Syria =

Basatin بساتين
- Village
- Location within Syria
- Coordinates: 35°7′55″N 35°57′26″E
- Country: Syria
- Governorate: Tartus
- District: Baniyas
- Subdistrict: Baniyas

Population (2004)
  - Total: 3,228
- Time zone: UTC+2 (EET)
  - Summer (DST): UTC+3 (EEST)

Basatin (Arabic: بساتين) is a village in northwestern Syria, administratively part of the Tartus Governorate, located north of Tartus. Nearby localities include Baniyas to the north, Kharibeh to the southeast and al-Bayda to the south. It is situated just east of the Mediterranean coast.

According to the Syria Central Bureau of Statistics, Basatin had a population of 3,288 in the 2004 census. The inhabitants of Basatin, as well as Baniyas city, al-Bayda and Marqab, are predominantly Sunni Muslims, in contrast to much of the area which is largely inhabited by members of the Alawite community.
