= Reyhanlı car bombing =

Reyhanlı car bombing may refer to one of the following:

- 2013 Reyhanlı car bombings
- 2019 Reyhanlı car bombing
