= Conquest of Arwad (649–650) =

- Part of the Muslim conquest of Syria (Arab–Byzantine wars)
Date	Winter 649 – Spring 650
Location	Arwad
Result	Rashidun victory
Territorial changes	Arwad captured by the Rashidun Caliphate

Belligerents
Rashidun Caliphate	Byzantine Empire

Commanders and leaders
Muʿawiya ibn Abī Sufyan	Unknown

The Conquest of Arwad was a naval siege of the Byzantine island of Arwad by the Rashidun Caliphate, under the command of Mu'awiya, the governor of Syria. After two sieges of the island, it fell to the Muslims.

== Background ==
Caliph Uthman's governor of Syria, Mu'awiya ibn Abi Sufyan, launched naval attacks on Cyprus, Constantinople, and Arwad. Arwad is situated 2 kilometers from Tartus, and was considered strategically important because of its closeness to the Syrian coast, excellent anchorage, and being a well-fortified island. Mu'awiya was aware that he could not leave it to the Byzantine hands. Shortly after his recent Cyprus campaign, he launched his attack towards it.

== Conquest ==
=== First Assault ===
In the winter of 649, Mu'awiya dispatched his navy carrying siege engines to capture Arwad. The Muslims made great efforts trying to capture the island, but the Byzantines stood firm, protected by a large fortress, which was inside the island's city. Seeing that his efforts were in vain, Mu'awiya dispatched a bishop called Thomarichos to compel the inhabitants to surrender and leave the island. When the bishop arrived on the island, the Byzantines arrested him and refused to submit to the Muslims. Since winter storms arrived, the Muslims were forced to abandon the effort and retreat. Mu'awiya went back to Damascus.

=== Second Assault ===
In the spring of 650, Mu'awiya returned. This time, he brought a large number of men and supplies for a long siege. When the Byzantines saw the large number of Muslims besieging them, they decided to surrender and accept safe passage from the Muslims. Some of the inhabitants went to Byzantine territory, while others went to Syria. After being depopulated, the island's fortifications were destroyed, and the city was razed. Mu'awiya did this hoping it wouldn't be a usable base for the Byzantines from which to launch attacks on Syria.

== Aftermath ==
The fall of Arwad, alongside Cyprus, was a strategic and symbolic victory for the Muslims, which alerted the Byzantines. The Muslim navy showed resolve to replace Byzantium as a regional power.

== Sources ==
- Heather N. Keaney (2021), 'Uthman Ibn 'Affan, Legend Or Liability?
- Robert G. Hoyland (2015), In God's Path, The Arab Conquests and the Creation of an Islamic Empire.
- Leif Inge Ree Petersen (2013), Siege Warfare and Military Organization in the Successor States (400-800 AD), Byzantium, the West and Islam.
