= Lake Yenişehir =

Lake in Turkey

- Yenişehir Gölü (Turkish)
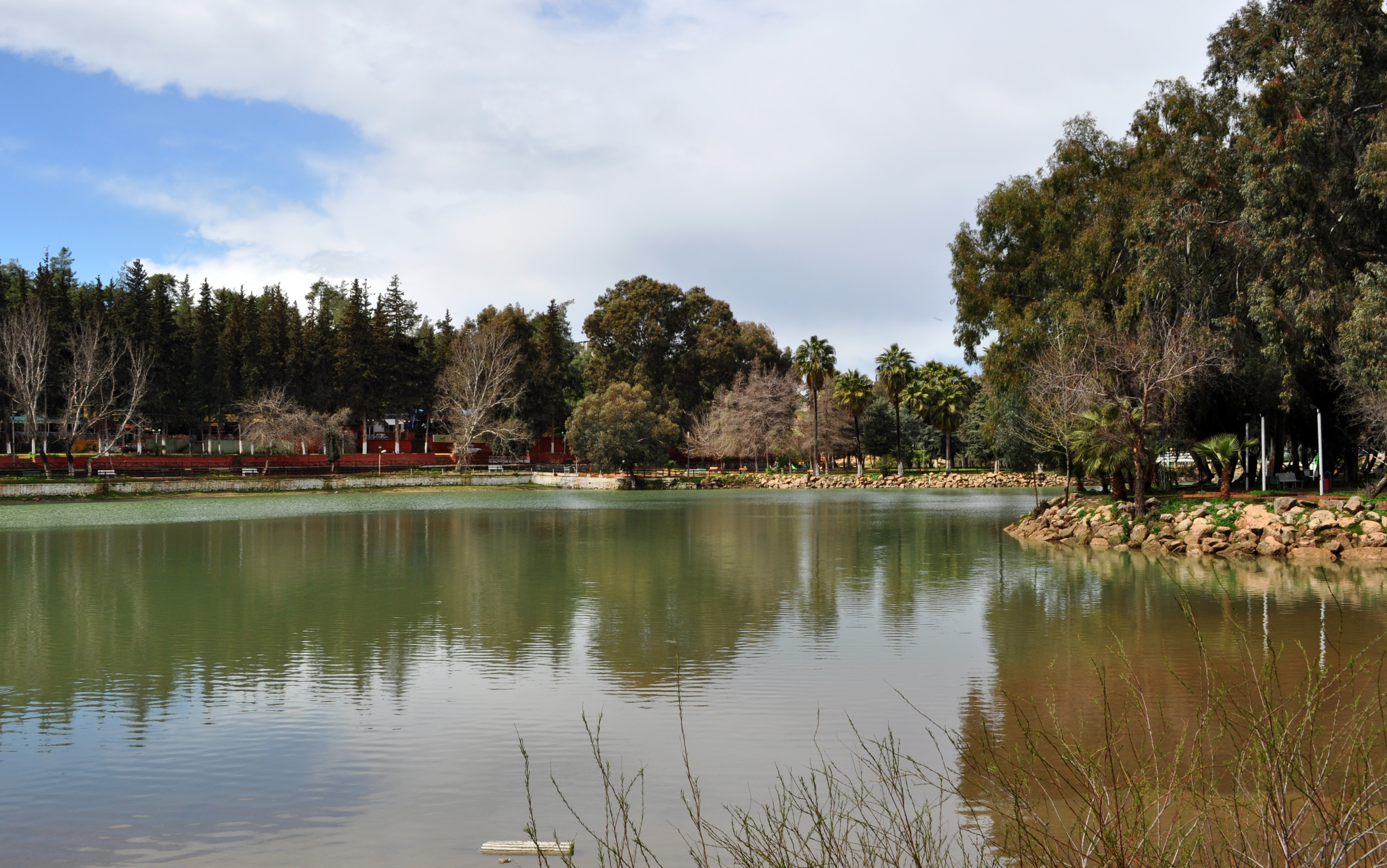
- Lake Yenişehir

- Location of the lake in Turkey.
- Interactive map of Lake Yenişehir
- Location: Hatay Province, Turkey
- Coordinates: 36°14′15″N 36°34′10″E
- Basin countries: Turkey
- Surface area: 20 daa (0.020 km^{2}; 0.0077 sq mi)
- Average depth: 8 m (26 ft)
- Surface elevation: 180 m (590 ft)

Lake Yenişehir (Turkish: Yenişehir Gölü, aka Lake Reyhanlı) is a small lake in Turkey.

The lake is at 36°14′15″N 36°34′10″E in Reyhanlı ilçe (district) of Hatay Province. Its distance Reyhanlı centrum is 4 kilometres (2.5 mi).

The surface area of the lake is 20 decares (0.020 km^{2}; 0.0077 sq mi) and its maximum dept is 8 metres (26 ft). It is fed by underground water. The lake is an artificial lake . It was formed in 1865 to reduce marsh land and later to provide water to the city. Now the lake is a popular picnic area of Reyhanlı citizens.
