= Syrian Resistance =

Pro-Assad Marxist paramilitary organization

Syrian Resistance المقاومة السورية
- Flag of the Syrian Resistance
- Leaders: Mihrac Ural (POW) (overall leader); Jamal Trabelsi (POW) (Director of the Information Office)
- Dates active: 2011 – Unknown
- Groups: Falcons of the Jazira and Euphrates
- Headquarters: Latakia (until 2024)
- Active regions: Syria: Latakia Governorate; Homs Governorate; Aleppo Governorate; Idlib Governorate
- Ideology: Communism; Marxism–Leninism; Socialist patriotism; Left-wing nationalism; Revolutionary socialism; Syrian nationalism; Anti-imperialism; Secularism; Restoration of Syrian Hatay
- Political position: Left-wing to Far-left
- Size: 2,000 (2015)
- Part of: Military Intelligence Directorate (until 2024)
- Wars: Syrian Civil War

The Syrian Resistance (Arabic: المقاومة السورية, romanized: al-Muqāwamat al-Sūriyah), formerly known as the Popular Front for the Liberation of the Sanjak of Iskandarun (Arabic: الجبهة الشعبية لتحرير لواء اسكندرون), was a Marxist-Leninist militia that operated in northwest Syria in support of the Ba'athist regime during the civil war.

== Background ==
The movement is led by Mihrac Ural, a Turkish Alawite who has Syrian citizenship and is also known as "Ali Kayyali" (علي كيالي). According to Today's Zaman, Ural was the leader of a clandestine insurgent cell in Hatay Province called the People's Liberation Party-Front of Turkey or Acilciler (The Urgentists). Zaman further alleged that Ural's group has sought to agitate Hatay's sizable Alawite population into confrontation with the Turkish authorities and has also recruited local Alawites to fight in Syria on behalf of the Syrian government. The group claims to also have supporters among Syria's Sunni Muslims and Christians.

Though the group openly espouses a broadly-inclusive platform of Syrian nationalism in addition to secular leftism, it has been claimed that its primary focus is the defence of the Alawite and Twelver Shi’a religious minorities of Syria. The Syrian Resistance has been accused by the Syrian opposition of being a sectarian Alawite militia, and of having carried out bombings and attacks in Turkey and on villages in Syria. However, Sheikh Muwaffaq al-Ghazal, a member of the Islamic Alawi Council, claims it has an inclusive national line regarding religion, race and gender.

== History ==
Founded before the Syrian civil war's outbreak under the name "Popular Front for the Liberation of the Sanjak of Iskandarun", the militia has been most active in Latakia Governorate, where its members reportedly committed a massacre in the town of Baniyas in 2013. The Turkish government has also suspected the Syrian Resistance of carrying out the Reyhanlı bombings.

On 29 March 2016, it was falsely reported that Mihraç Ural had been killed by Ahrar al-Sham.

In late July 2016, the Syrian Resistance sent reinforcement contingents from Hama to Aleppo in order to support the pro-government forces during the 2016 Aleppo campaign. In course of the campaign, they were deployed both in the northern city at the Castello road front, as well as in the south where rebel forces launched a counter-offensive.

At some point, the "Falcons of the Jazira and Euphrates", a militia of Deir ez-Zor Governorate natives, officially joined the Syrian Resistance, though it remained operationally fully autonomous. Under the Syrian Resistance's flag, this unit took part in the central Syria campaign of mid-2017. This militia was closely affiliated to major general Mohammad Khaddour.

Jamal Trabelsi, director of the Syrian Resistance's information office, was targeted by an improvised explosive device (IED) in Aleppo in July 2017, though he survived. The group accused "Turkey-backed & hired gangs" of being behind the attack. A few days later, a female media officer of the Syrian Resistance, Duaa Hayel Sulaiman, was assassinated in Damascus.

When the Syrian opposition started large-scale offensives in late 2024, the Syrian Resistance took part in pro-government defensive efforts. Under Ural, the militia was one of the groups which unsuccessfully attempted to hold Hama. After the fall of the Assad regime, the Syrian Resistance's headquarters and weapons depots in Latakia were occupied by the forces of the Syrian caretaker government. Ural initially managed to evade capture and remain in hiding until October of 2026; he gave an interview in March 2025, accusing Russia of having engineered the collapse of the Assad regime. He called on Alawites and Kurds to fight the Syrian transitional government and expressed support for the federalization of Syria.

Mirhac Ural was arrested by Syrian intelligence on October 15, 2026.

== See also ==
- List of armed groups in the Syrian Civil War
