= Anas Al-Sheghri =

- أنس الشغري
- Born: 1988 (age 37–38); Al-Bayda, Baniyas, Syria
- Known for: leading and organizing protests in Baniyas in the beginning of the Syrian Revolution

Anas Al-Sheghri (Arabic: أنس الشغري; born 1988) is a Syrian political activist who emerged as a prominent figure during the early protests of the Syrian civil war.

== Biography ==
Anas Al-Sheghri was born in the village of Al-Bayda near the city of Baniyas. He was in his third year as a student at the School of Economics at Latakia University (then Tishreen University), when the Syrian uprising against the government of Bashar al-Assad erupted in March 2011.

According to his biography at Free Syrian Translators website, Anas played a leading role in stimulating the protests that called for democracy and for the toppling of al-Assad's government in the city of Baniyas, which is considered the second city to rebel in Syria after Daraa.

Anas had also played an important role in the media coverage of the uprising. He was one of the first Syrian activists inside the country to speak to the Media using his real name. It is also important to mention that Baniyas was the first city to broadcast its demonstrations live to the news media.

Anas was arrested on May 14, 2011 when the Syrian army and the security forces along with the Shabiha stormed the city of Baniyas. Dunia TV (which is very close to the Syrian government) announced that the reason behind Anas' arrest is his alleged involvement in an attempt to establish an Islamic State and his appointment as the "Minister of Interior" in this alleged state.

The fate of Anas and his whereabouts are not yet known. It is not affirmed whether he has died at some detention center that belongs to one of the various Intelligence agencies in Syria or he is still alive. What is certain, though, is that he became one of the icons of the Syrian revolution against Bashar al-Assad.
