= Barthélemy de Quincy =

Marshal of the Knights Templar

Barthélemy de Quincy (died 26 September 1302) was Marshal of the Knights Templar during the mastership of Jacques de Molay.

== Career ==
Barthélemy probably originated from the Duchy of Burgundy. The date of his departure for the Holy Land and his entry into the order of the Temple are unknown. He was named marshal of the order around 1294.

In the meantime, the Order tried to organize a campaign to reconquer the Holy Land in alliance with the Mongols under Ghazan. By the end of September 1300, Ghazan set out from Tabriz, while Templars and Hospitallers and the King of Cyprus positioned their troops on the island of Ruad in front of the former Templar stronghold of Tartus. However, an unusually severe winter halted the Mongol advance, and Ghazan was forced to delay attacking the Mamluks until a later date. Meanwhile, the Templars held the island and from there repeatedly made forays into the mainland.

In November 1301, Pope Boniface VIII granted the island of Ruad to the Templars. They reinforced the fortifications and set up a permanent force under the command of Marshal of the Templars Barthélemy de Quincy.

In 1302, the Mamluks sent a fleet of 16 ships from Egypt to Tripoli, from which they besieged Ruad. They disembarked at two points and set up their own encampment. The Templars fought the invaders, but were eventually starved out. The Cypriots had been assembling a fleet to rescue Ruad, which set out from Famagusta, but did not arrive in time.

On Ruad, Brother Hugh of Dampierre negotiated a surrender to the Mamluks on September 26, under the condition that they could safely escape to a Christian land of their choice. However after they emerged conflict soon started, Barthélemy de Quincy was killed in the conflict, all the bowmen and Syrian Christian footsoldiers were executed, and dozens of the surviving Templar knights were taken as prisoners to Cairo.

== Sources ==
- Barber, Malcolm (1995). The New Knighthood. Cambridge University Press. ISBN 0-521-55872-7.
- Barber, Malcolm (2006). The trial of the templars. Cambridge University Press. ISBN 0-521-85639-6.
- Burgtorf, Jochen (2008). The Central Convent of Hospitallers and Templars : History, Organization, and Personnel (1099/1120-1310). Brill. ISBN 978-90-04-16660-8.
- Claverie, Pierre-Vincent (2005). L'ordre du Temple en Terre Sainte et à Chypre au xiiie siècle (in French). Nicosia: Center for Scientific Research. ISBN 978-9-9630-8094-6.
- Demurger, Alain (2005). Der letzte Templer. Leben und Sterben des Großmeisters Jacques de Molay (in German). C.H. Beck. ISBN 3-406-52202-5.
