= Margat =

Historic castle in Syria

Margat Castle
- قلعة المرقب
- Near Baniyas, Syria
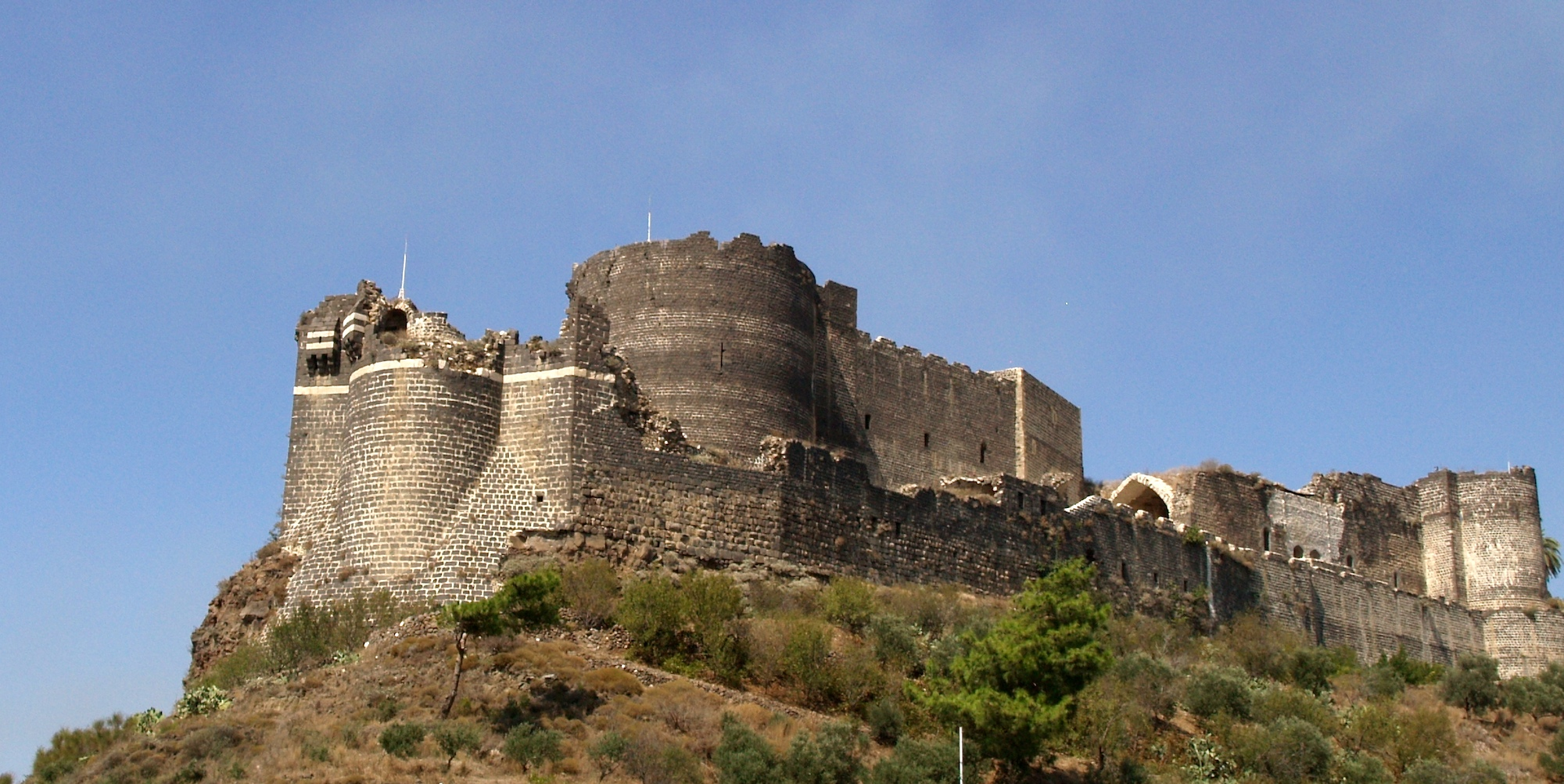
- Margat, a Crusader castle in northern Syria

Site information
- Type: Concentric castle
- Owner: Al-Markabi Family
- Open to the public: Yes
- Condition: Ruin, under renovation

Location
- Location within Syria
- Coordinates: 35.151111°N 35.949167°E

Site history
- Built: 1062
- Materials: Basalt

Margat Castle, also known as Marqab Castle (Arabic: قلعة المرقب, romanized: Qalʻat al-Marqab, lit. 'Castle of the Watchtower'), is a castle near Baniyas, Syria, which was a Crusader fortress and one of the major strongholds of the Knights Hospitaller. It is located around 2 kilometres (1.2 mi) from the Mediterranean coast and approximately 6 kilometres (3.7 mi) south of Baniyas. The castle remained in a poor state of preservation until 2007 when some reconstruction and renovation began.

== Fortress ==
=== History ===
Margat is located on a hill formed by an extinct volcano about 360 metres (1,180 ft) above sea level on the road between Tripoli and Latakia, overlooking the Mediterranean Sea.

According to Arab sources, the site of Margat Castle was first fortified in 1062 by Muslims who continued to hold it within the Christian Principality of Antioch in the aftermath of the First Crusade. When the Principality was defeated at the Battle of Harran in 1104, the Byzantine Empire took advantage of their weakness and captured Margat (Note: Margat was also known as Margathum or Margant.) from the Muslims. A few years later it was captured by Tancred, Prince of Galilee, regent of Antioch, and became part of the Principality.

In the 1170s, it was controlled by Rainald II Masoir of Antioch as a vassal of the count of Tripoli. The fortress was so large that it had its own household officials and a number of rear-vassals. Rainald II's son Bertrand sold it to the Hospitallers in 1186 as it was too expensive for the Mazoir family to maintain. After some rebuilding and expansion by the Hospitallers it became their headquarters in Syria. Under Hospitaller control, its fourteen towers were thought to be impregnable.

In 1188, Saladin marched on Margat having left Krak des Chevaliers in search of easier prey. According to Abu'l-Fida, "Recognising that Maqab was impregnable and that he had no hope of capturing it, he passed on to Jabala". It was one of the few remaining territories left in Christian hands after Saladin's conquests.

In 1206, the Ayyubid Sultanate attempted to take Margat. The siege was successfully repulsed by the garrison of the castle.

By the beginning of the 13th century the Hospitallers controlled the surrounding land and roads and made a large profit from travellers and pilgrims passing through. Isaac Comnenus of Cyprus was imprisoned there after Richard I of England captured Cyprus from him during the Third Crusade. The bishop of nearby Valenia also used Margat as his headquarters after around 1240. Margat was second in size and power only to the other Hospitaller fortress to the south, Krak des Chevaliers.

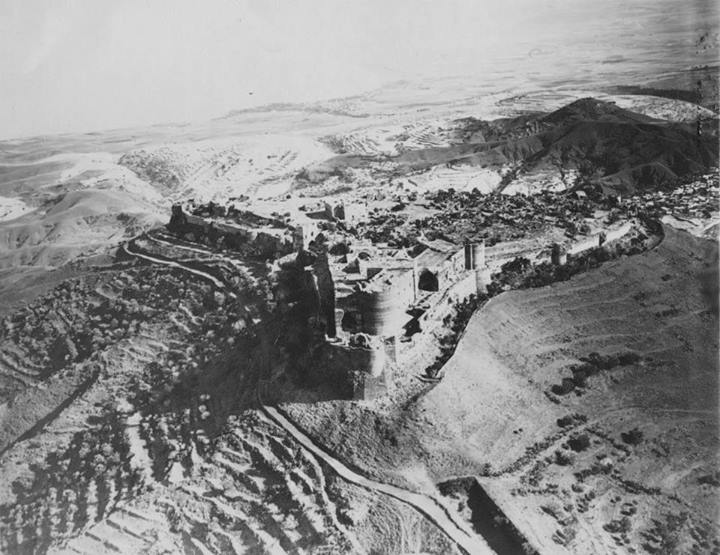
Aerial photograph of Margat, taken in the 1930s

In September 1281, the Hospitallers of Margat dispatched a contingent of troops to support the Mongol invasion of Syria, which the Mamluk sultan of Egypt Qalawun successfully prevented after defeating the coalition at Homs. To punish the Hospitallers, Qalawun clandestinely raised an army in Damascus and besieged Margat on 17 April 1285. After a 38-day siege during which sappers and miners managed to dig several tunnels underneath the fortress's walls, a mine destroyed a salient of the southernmost wall. The defenders panicked and on discovering the numerous tunnels around the fortress, surrendered to the Mamluk commander Fakhr al-Din Mukri on 23 May, with Qalwun entering Margat two days later. The siege was witnessed by eleven-year-old Abu'l Fida and his father, the Ayyubid governor of Hama. Qalawun allowed the Hospitallers to leave with everything they could carry. Rather than destroy Margat as he did with other fortresses, he repaired its defences and placed a strong garrison there due to its strategic value.

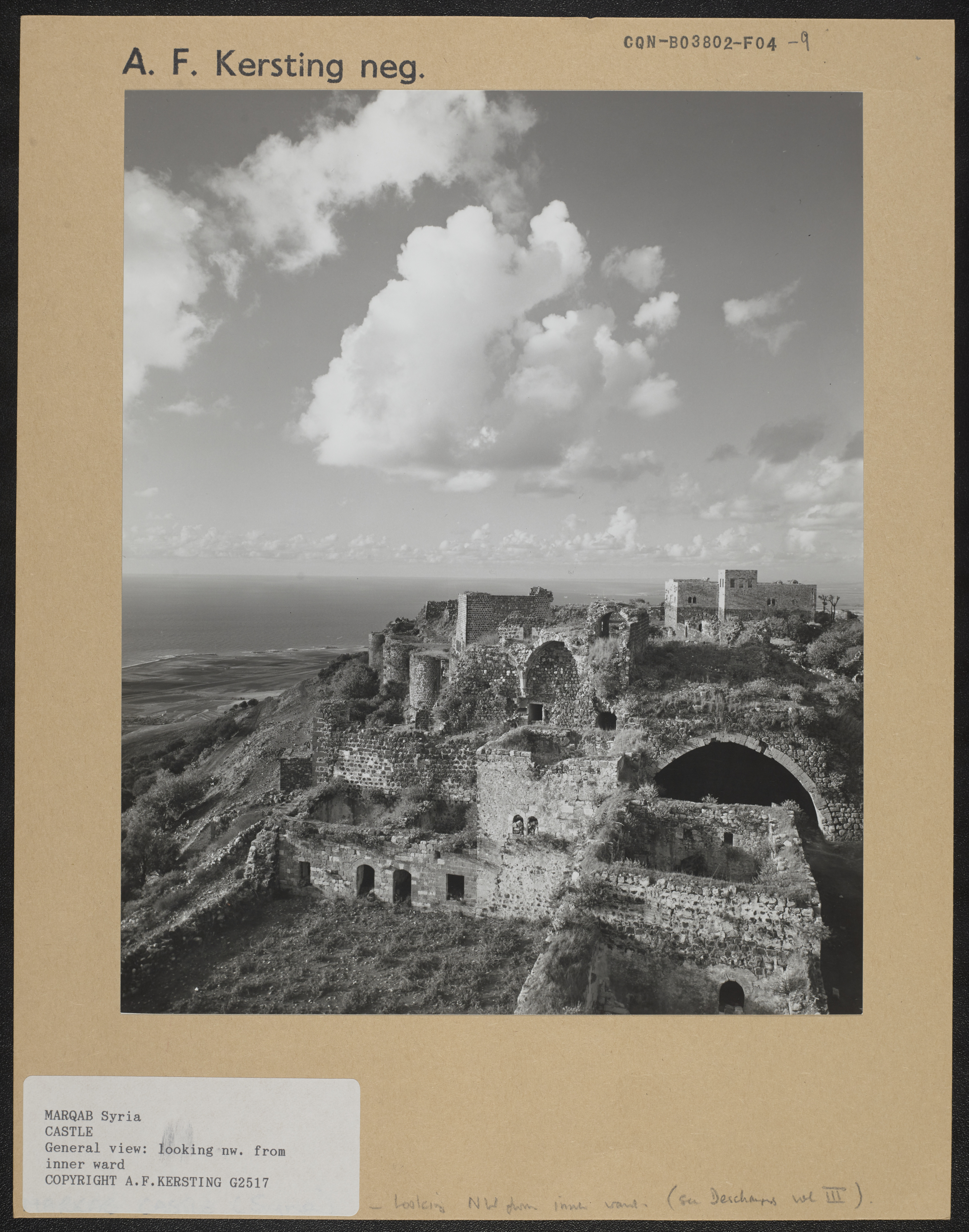
The North West view from the castle. Photograph by Anthony F. Kersting.

Marqat, known as Marqab by the Muslims, became a district of the Mamluk province of Tripoli with maintenance of the area financed by the sultan. Intrepid traveller Ibn Battuta visited the fortress and noted that a suburb was built outside of it for foreigners, who were not allowed entry into the fortress. The district governor based at the Marqab fortress held the military rank of "Emir of 20 Mamluks." He was charged with defending the coast, particularly from threats from the island of Cyprus, and maintaining the guard towers and observation posts. During the Burji Mamluk period, Margat was well known in the region for containing an imperial prison with many high-profile inmates. The 15th-century Muslim historian Khalil al-Zahiri noted that Marqab fortress was among the most important sites of Tripoli province. Marqab was "clearly impregnable and controls a territory containing numerous villages."

During the Ottoman era, Margat became the administrative center of a kaza ("district") of the same name, which contained three nahiyas ("subdistricts") — Margat, Qadmus and Khawabi. In the 1890s there was a total of 393 localities with a collective population of 39,671, of whom 21,121 were Alawites. The chief agricultural products were olives, onions, tobacco and silk, which were largely marketed to Beirut-based merchants. The fortress served as the residence of the kaymakam ("military governor") of the district until 1884 when the seat was transferred to Baniyas.

The last known owner of the castle was Al-Markabi family (“Al-Marqabi”) where the name was based on the castle. In 2023, the castle was damaged during the February earthquake.

=== Architecture ===
Castles in Europe provided lordly accommodation for their owners and acted as centres of administration. In the Levant the need for defence was paramount and this was reflected in castle design. Historian Hugh Kennedy suggests that "The castle scientifically designed as a fighting machine surely reached its apogee in great buildings like Margat and Crac des Chevaliers." Like the Krak des Chevaliers, Margat is a large spur castle with many typical elements of a concentric castle. It has a bent entrance leading through the base of a gate tower. A notable feature of the inner defences is a large circular tower, sometimes referred to as a donjon (though it should not be confused with a central keep). Unlike the Krak Des Chevaliers, Margat has a large outer ward, giving it a larger total area.

== Village of al-Marqab ==
Al-Marqab المرقب
- Village
- Location within Syria
- Coordinates: 35°9′29″N 35°57′20″E
- Country: Syria
- Governorate: Tartus
- District: Baniyas
- Subdistrict: Baniyas

Population (2004)
  - Total: 2,618
- Time zone: UTC+2 (EET)
  - Summer (DST): UTC+3 (EEST)

The village of al-Marqab (Arabic: المرقب) is located just north of the castle, straddling the road leading north to the coastal city of Baniyas. Nearby localities besides Baniyas, include Talin to the east, Osaibah to the southeast with Basatin al-Assad and al-Bayda to the south. According to the Syria Central Bureau of Statistics (CBS), al-Marqab had a population of 2,618 as of the 2004 census. Its inhabitants are predominantly Sunni Muslims. Together, al-Marqab, Basatin al-Assad and al-Bayda form a mostly Sunni Muslim-inhabited enclave in an area largely populated by members of the Alawite community.

A suburb has existed outside the fortress since at least the late 12th century, during Crusader rule. During this period, its chief exports were sumac, wine, must, almonds, figs and pottery. In 1325 North African geographer Ibn Batuta visited the suburb. In 1938 al-Marqab stood near the foot of the fortress and was among five Sunni Muslim villages in the area, which also contained several Alawite, Greek Orthodox, Greek Catholic and Maronite villages. In 1945, at the end of the French Mandate, al-Marqab had a population of 832. Starting in 1968, it experienced significant prosperity due to the construction of the Iraq Petroleum Company pipeline and petroleum port at Baniyas.

== See also ==
- List of Crusader castles
- List of castles in Syria

== Sources ==
- Kennedy, Hugh (1994), Crusader Castles, Cambridge: Cambridge University Press, ISBN 0-521-42068-7
- W. P. Heinrichs, ed. (1989), "Al-Markab", E. J. Brill's The Encyclopaedia of Islam, vol. 4, BRILL, ISBN 9789004090828
