= Al-Bayda, Tartus Governorate =

al-Bayda ٱلْبَيْضَاء al-Beida
- Village
- Location within Syria
- Coordinates: 35°7′30″N 35°56′55″E
- Country: Syria
- Governorate: Tartus
- District: Baniyas
- Subdistrict: Baniyas
- Elevation: 149 m (488 ft)

Population (2004)
  - Total: 5,783
- Time zone: UTC+2 (EET)
  - Summer (DST): UTC+3 (EEST)

Al-Bayda (Arabic: ٱلْبَيْضَاء, romanized: al-Bayḍāʾ, also spelled al-Beida) is a village in northwestern Syria, administratively part of the Tartus Governorate, located north of Tartus. Nearby localities include Baniyas to the north, Kharibah to the east and Maten al-Sahel to the south. It is situated just east of the Mediterranean coast. According to the Syria Central Bureau of Statistics, al-Bayda had a population of 5,783 in the 2004 census, making it the second largest locality in the Baniyas nahiyah ("subdistrict") after the city of Baniyas. The majority of al-Bayda are predominantly Sunni Muslims with a Christian minority, and together with Baniyas, Basatin al-Assad and Marqab, the villages form a large Sunni population amid an Alawite-inhabited area.

During the Syrian civil war, al-Bayda fell under the control of anti-Assad elements. In May 2013 the village was subjected to government bombardment that reportedly left over 100 dead, including the town's mayor and his family. According to main opposition group, a massacre took place on 2 May, committed by government and pro-government forces. "Syrian troops, backed by gunmen from nearby Alawite villages, swept into the village, torched homes and used knives, guns and blunt objects to kill people in the streets."
