= Mihrac Ural =

Syrian resistance leader

- معراج أورال
- Born: 1956 (age 69–70)
- Military career
- Allegiance: Ba'athist Syria
- Conflicts: Syrian civil war; Northwestern Syria offensive (April–August 2019)

Mihrac Ural (Arabic: معراج أورال), also known as Ali Kayali (Arabic: علي كيالي), is a Turkish-Syrian militant and former leader of the Syrian Resistance (formerly known as the Popular Front for the Liberation of the Sanjak of Iskandarun), a pro-Ba'athist Syrian militia.

== Early life and move to Syria ==
Ural was born in 1956 into an Arab Alawite family in Antakya, Hatay Province, Turkey. He studied philosophy at Istanbul University.

In 1976, Ural joined the People's Liberation Party-Front of Turkey splinter group known as the Acilciler ("Urgent Ones"). He was detained on 10 March 1978 over a bank robbery and was imprisoned at Adana. Accounts of how he left prison in 1980 differ: some reports say he escaped through a tunnel, while Sabah reported that guards were bribed to arrange a fake release. He then fled to Syria; sources give the year as either 1980 or 1982. He obtained Syrian citizenship during the rule of Hafez al-Assad; Turkish reports state the papers were issued on the orders of Hafez's brother, Jamil al-Assad. In Syria, he went on to lead the Acilciler.

== Career ==
In 1982 he was arrested in Stuttgart, Germany, and spent time in prison. He was detained at the Fleury-Mérogis Prison in France in 1988. Ural led the Popular Front for the Liberation of the Sanjak of Iskenderun, now known as the Syrian Resistance from 1986 until his arrest in October 2026.

=== Syrian civil war ===
Ural was accused of involvement in the Bayda and Baniyas massacres and the Reyhanlı bombings of May 2013, but denied responsibility. In March 2016 the Syrian Islamist jihadist group Ahrar al-Sham wrongly claimed to have killed Ural.

In late January and early February 2018, Ural attended a Russian-sponsored Syrian peace conference in Sochi, Russia. Turkish foreign minister Mevlüt Çavuşoğlu protested his attendance, saying "We want this person’s immediate arrest and extradition to Turkey".

Ural was seriously injured on 6 July 2019, after his vehicle struck a roadside bomb while travelling along the Latakia-Slinfah road, after which he was flown by helicopter to a government hospital in Damascus for treatment. The bombing happened in the context of the Northwestern Syria offensive (April–August 2019), with Syrian Islamist group Tahrir al-Sham claiming responsibility for the attack.

=== Fall of the Ba'athist-led regime ===
Following the collapse of the Ba'athist government at the end of 2024, Ural gave an interview in 2025 discussing his perspectives on the fall of the government, saying that orders were given for the army to not resist HTS's offensive despite many in the rank and file of the army being willing to fight. He stated that the Syrian Resistance saw the "Assad book as closed. Assad cannot return, he cannot do anything [...] We no longer have a path to walk with Bashar Assad. Whether this is in the form of Bashar Assad being arrested or something he did of his own volition." He further stated that the he believes what Alawites in Syria need is a federal model to ensure their ability to defend against sectarian massacres and that Alawites must work with the Druze and Kurds against both the new Syrian Islamist government and Israel.

On 15 October 2026, Ural was arrested by the General Intelligence Service while attempting to flee across a border at an unknown location.
