= Bayda and Baniyas massacres =

Massacres in Syria

Coordinates: 35.125°N 35.9486°E

- Part of the Syrian civil war
- Location: Bayda and Baniyas, Tartus Governorate, Syria
- Date: 2–3 May 2013 (1 day)
- Attack type: Shootout/Massacre, Ethnic cleansing
- Deaths: 248 (Human Rights Watch)
- Perpetrators: Ba'athist Syria: Syrian Army; National Defense Force; Shabiha

The Bayda and Baniyas massacres were two massacres that occurred in May 2013 in the village of Bayda and the city of Baniyas, in Tartus Governorate, Syria, where Ba'athist Syrian Army troops, supported by Assadist paramilitaries, killed civilians in the predominantly Sunni locales. The killings were supposedly in retaliation for an earlier rebel attack near the town that left at least half a dozen soldiers dead.

There were reports of whole families being killed in the two massacres 2–3 May, and thousands were attempting to flee the area. At least 100 people were killed, while others say that number exceeds 400. Human Rights Watch put the number of dead at 248 in mass summary executions. According to a UN report released in 2013, between 300 and 450 people were killed (150-250 respectively 150–200). Survivors have testified that it was regular troops, backed by the paramilitary National Defence Force (NDF), that entered the village and began "a murderous attack: burning, looting and killing".

== Events ==
=== Soldiers killed ===
Early on 2 May 2013, rebels fought with Ba'athist Syrian troops near Bayda. Activists said a bus carrying Assadist militants, known as Shabiha, was attacked, killing seven and wounding 20–30. Ba'athist Syrian Army forces and Shabiha militiamen from the surrounding area returned in the afternoon and stormed the village.

=== Village raided ===
Syrian troops backed by the pro-government gunmen swept into the village in the mountains near the Mediterranean coast killing dozens of people, including women and children, and torching homes. Before the militia entered the village, the military bombarded Bayda from the sea with rockets.

The UK-based Syrian Observatory for Human Rights stated they were able to document the deaths of 51 people. Another activist report documented 72 deaths. Opposition activists said that, although Bayda was rebel-held, only 14 rebel fighters were in the village. One opposition activist stated that the attack was in fact retaliation for another attack in a neighbouring area four days previously that had resulted in the death of several soldiers.

Victims included Bayda's former village imam of 30 years, Sheikh Biyasi, described as "a government loyalist who alienated local people with his political views before resigning two years ago." According to one survivor, "even though he always opposed the protests, they still killed him." The Biyasi family was described by Reuters as suffering "some of the worst losses, with 36 documented deaths".

=== Baniyas massacre ===
On 3 May, another massacre was, according to SOHR, perpetrated in the Ras al-Nabaa district of Baniyas causing hundreds of Sunni residents to flee their homes. According to one opposition report, a total of 77 civilians, including 14 children, were killed. Another two opposition groups documented, by name, 96-145 people who are thought to have been executed in the district. Four pro-government militiamen and two soldiers were also killed in the area in clashes with rebel fighters.

Syrian state media stated their forces were seeking only to clear the area of "terrorists". Mihrac Ural, chief of the Alawite "Syrian Resistance" militant group publicly called to launch ethno-sectarian cleansing against the residents of Baniyas. In a video released on 5 May 2013, he said: "Banias must be soon besieged,... and cleansed". According to human rights activists and eyewitnesses in Syria, over 200 civilians were killed and hundreds more forcibly disappeared in the massacre.
