= List of islands of Syria =

Syria is a country in Western Asia, bordering Lebanon and the Mediterranean Sea to the west, Turkey to the north, Iraq to the east, Jordan to the south, and Israel to the southwest. The geography of Syria includes fertile plains, high mountains, and deserts.

== Sea islands ==
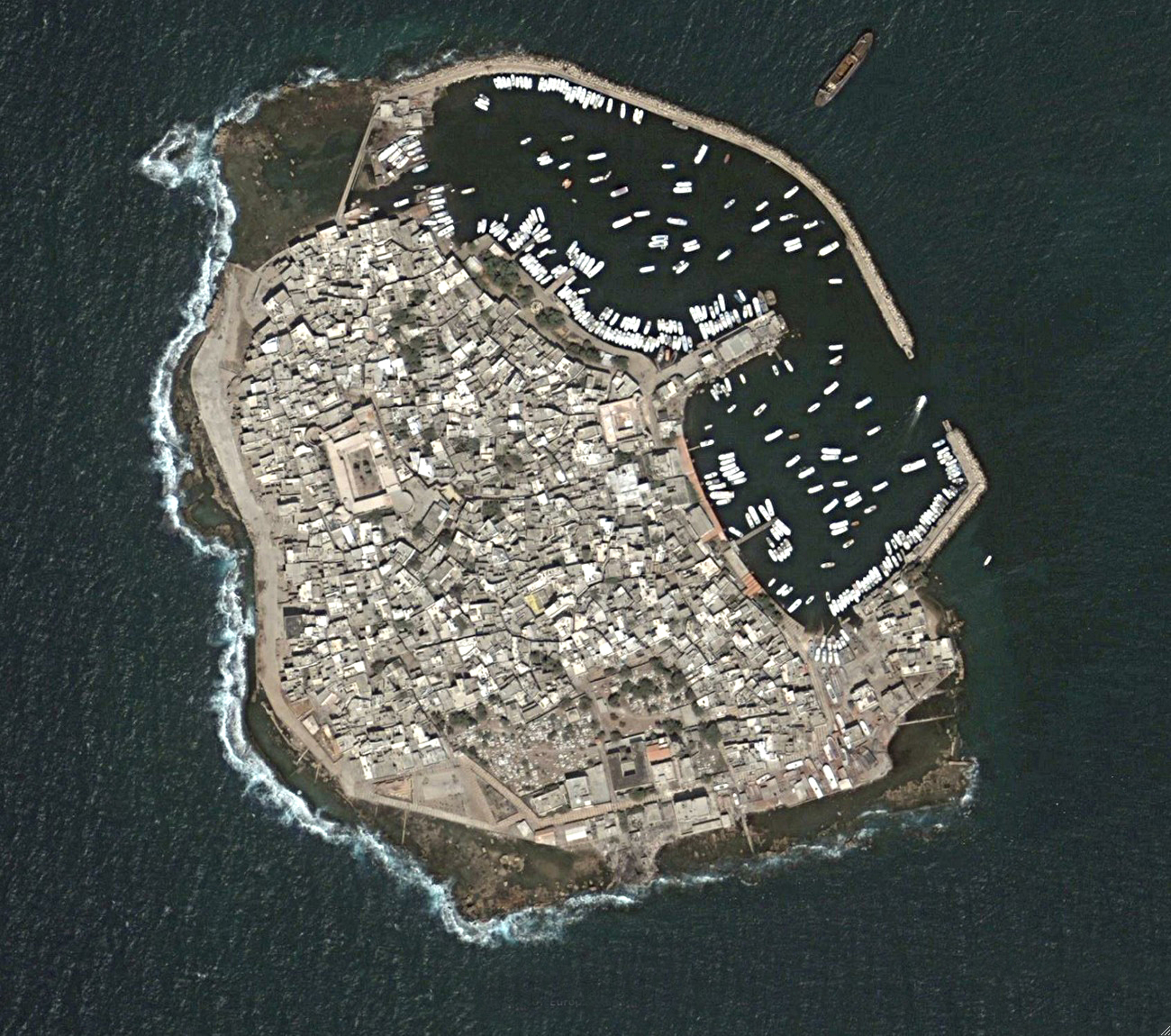
A satellite image of Arwad

There are exactly five ocean islands belonging to Syria. They are all close to the Mediterranean Sea coast in the region of Tartus:

- Jazirat Basirah: about 4,500 m^{2}, it is located 770 metres from Syria beach. 34°58′59″N 35°52′10″E
- Arwad, largest island of Syria, and only inhabited one.
- Al-Abbas: in the south Arwad Island, about 13.000 m^{2}, it is located 3.49 kilometres from Arwad and 2,77 kilometres from Syria beach. 34°49′23″N 35°52′22″E
- Maqrud: rock island, about 3.000 m^{2}, it is located 3.47 kilometres from Syria beach. 34°46′58″N 35°53′10″E
- Al-Faris: rock island, 2.000 m^{2}, it is located 3.3 kilometres from Syria beach. 34°47′39″N 35°52′56″E
  - Al-Faniyas: small rock island, near Abu al Faris island at northwest, ~ 100 m^{2}.

Note: List of island from North to South.

== Inland islands ==
- Qal'at Ja'bar: a castle on a hill-top which became an island with the formation of Euphrates Lake in 1974.
- Jazirat al-Thawra: The Island of the Revolution is a designated nature reserve in Euphrates Lake.
