= Fall of Ruad =

Siege; brought the Crusader period to an end in the Holy Land

Coordinates: 34°51′22″N 35°51′30″E

- Part of the Crusades
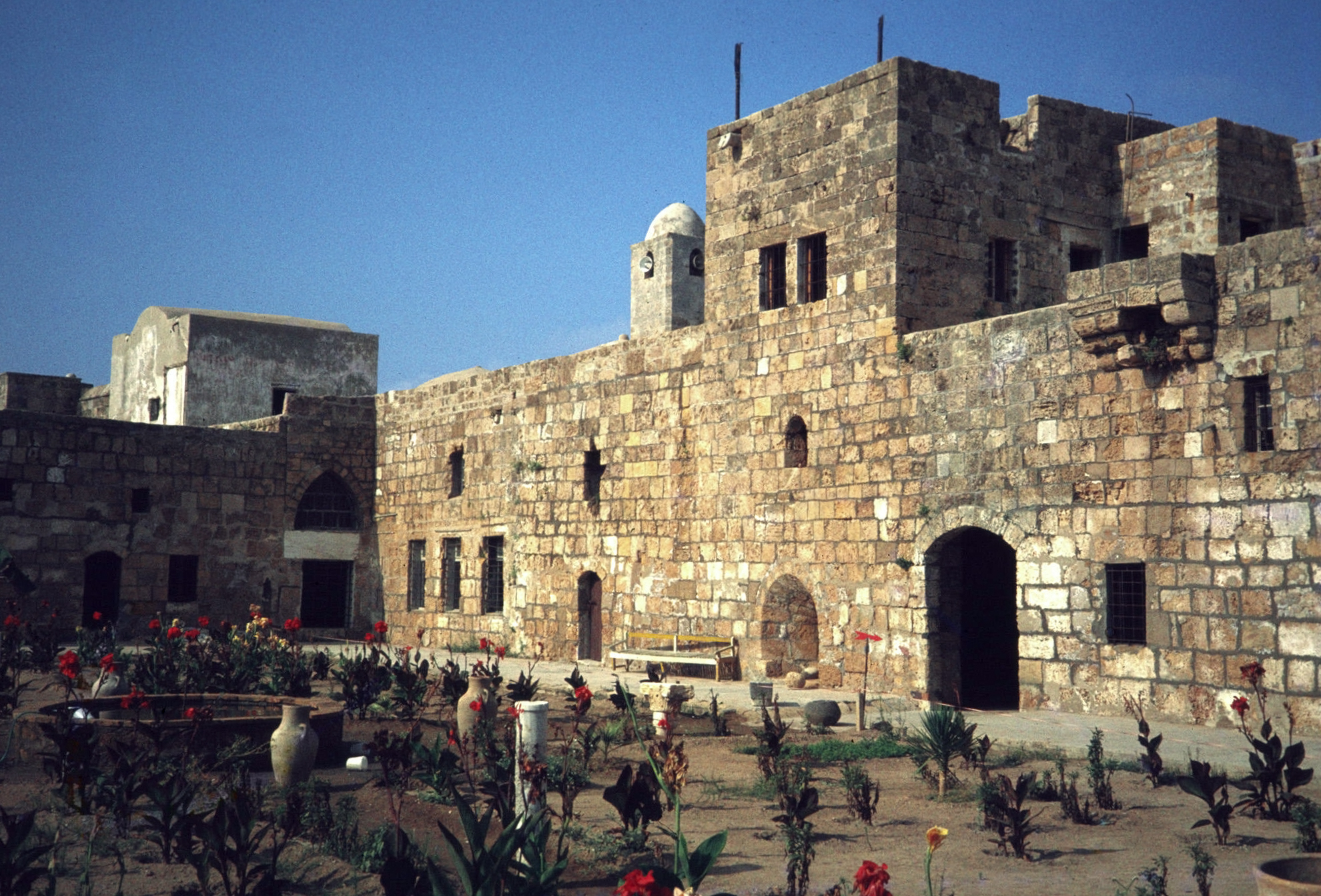
- Ruins of the fortress of Ruad, where the Crusaders attempted to set up a bridgehead to re-take the Holy Land
Date	1302
Location	Isle of Ruad
Result	Mamluk victory
Territorial changes	End of the Crusader States

Belligerents
Mamluk Sultanate	Knights Templar

Commanders and leaders
Sayf al-Din Salar	Barthélemy de Quincy †

Strength
Unknown	120 Knights Templar; 500 Templar archers; 400 Templar sergeants

Casualties and losses
Unknown	Almost all Knights Templar (except some 40 knights as prisoners). Most archers and sergeants were killed.

The fall of Ruad in 1302 was one of the culminating events of the Crusades in the Eastern Mediterranean. In 1291, the Crusaders had lost their main power base at the coastal city of Acre, and the Muslim Mamluks had been systematically destroying the remaining Crusader ports and fortresses in the region, forcing the Crusaders to relocate the dwindling Kingdom of Jerusalem to the island of Cyprus. In 1299–1300, the Cypriots sought to retake the Syrian port city of Tortosa, by setting up a staging area on Ruad, two miles (3 km) off the coast of Tortosa. The plans were to coordinate an offensive between the forces of the Crusaders, and those of the Ilkhanate (Mongol Persia). However, though the Crusaders successfully established a bridgehead on the island, the Mongols did not arrive, and the Crusaders were forced to withdraw the bulk of their forces to Cyprus. The Knights Templar set up a permanent garrison on the island in 1300, but the Mamluks besieged and captured Ruad in 1302. With the loss of the island, the Crusaders lost their last foothold in the Holy Land marking the end of their presence in the Levant region.

== Background ==
Mongol advances, 1299–1303. They had a major success near Homs in 1300 at the Battle of Wadi al-Khazandar (also called the Third Battle of Homs), and were able to launch some raids southwards into Palestine for a few months before retreating. In 1303, they suffered a crushing defeat at the Battle of Marj al-Saffar, which marked the end of their incursions into Syria.

When Jerusalem was lost in 1187, the Crusaders moved their headquarters to the coastal city of Acre, which they held for another century, until it fell in 1291 to Mamluk forces. They then moved their headquarters north to Tortosa on the coast of Syria, but lost that too three months later, as well as the stronghold of Atlit (south of Acre). The remaining elements of the dwindling Kingdom of Jerusalem relocated their headquarters offshore to the island of Cyprus.

In 1298–99 the Mamluks attacked Syria, capturing Servantikar and Roche-Guillaume (in what had previously been Antioch). This marked the capture of the last Templar stronghold in the Levant. The Grand Master of the Templars, Jacques de Molay, and the leader of the Hospitallers, Guillaume de Villaret, apparently participated in the ineffective defense of these fortresses, the losses of which prompted the Armenian king Hethum II to request the intervention of the Mongol ruler of Persia, Ghazan.

In 1299, as he prepared an offensive against Syria, Ghazan had sent embassies to Henry II of Jerusalem (now located on Cyprus) and to Pope Boniface VIII, inviting them to participate in combined operations against the Mamluks. Henry made some attempts to combine with the Mongols, and in the autumn of 1299 sent a small fleet of two galleys, led by Guy of Ibelin and John of Giblet, to join Ghazan. The fleet successfully reoccupied Botrun on the mainland (in modern times this would be along the coast of Lebanon), and for a few months, until February 1300, began rebuilding the fortress of Nephin.

Ghazan inflicted a crushing defeat on the Mamluks on 22 December 1299 at the Battle of Wadi al-Khazandar near Homs in Syria. He was assisted by his vassal Hethum II, whose forces included a contingent of Templars and Hospitallers from Little Armenia. But Ghazan then had to retreat the bulk of his forces in February, due to a revolt in the East during the Mongol civil war, as he was being attacked by one of his cousins, Qutlugh-Khoja, the son of the Jagataid ruler of Turkestan. Before leaving, Ghazan announced that he would return by November 1300, and sent letters and ambassadors to the West so that they could prepare themselves. Ghazan's remaining forces in the area launched some Mongol raids into Palestine from December 1299 until May 1300, raiding the Jordan River Valley, reaching as far as Gaza and entering multiple towns, probably including Jerusalem. The Mongols' success in Syria inspired enthusiastic rumours in the West, that the Holy Land had been conquered and that Jerusalem was to be returned to the West. In May however, when the Egyptians again advanced from Cairo, the remaining Mongols retreated with little resistance.

In July 1300, King Henry II of Jerusalem and the other Cypriots set up a naval raiding operation. Sixteen galleys combining the forces of Cyprus with those of the Templars and Hospitallers, and accompanied by Ghazan's ambassador Isol the Pisan, were able to raid Rosetta, Alexandria, Acre, Tortosa and Maraclea.

== Ruad as bridgehead ==
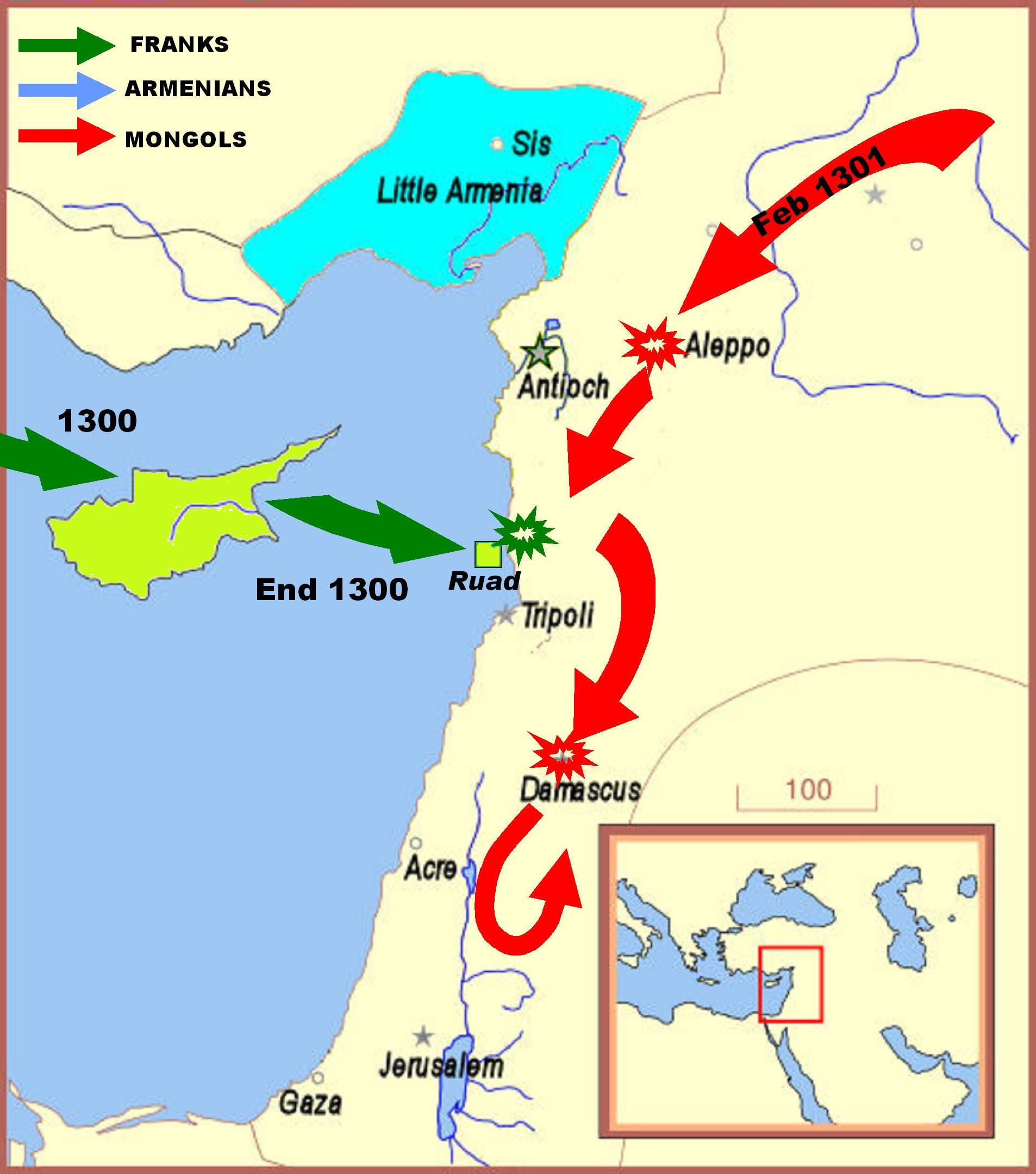
Though they were not able to satisfactorily combine their activities, the Europeans (green arrows) and Mongols (red arrows) did attempt to coordinate an offensive near Tortosa and the Isle of Ruad

The citadel of Atlit having been dismantled by the Mamluks in 1291, Tortosa remained the most likely stronghold on the mainland which had the potential to be recaptured. From Cyprus, King Henry and members of the three military orders (Knights Templar, Knights Hospitaller and Teutonic Knights), attempted to retake Tortosa in 1300. The plan was to establish a bridgehead on the tiny waterless island of Ruad, just two miles (3 km) off the coast, from which they could launch raids on the city.

On the eve of the Ruad expedition, relations between the Templars and the King of Cyprus, Henry II, were strained, as the former Grand Master Guillaume de Beaujeu had supported a rival claimant to the Cypriot throne. Pope Boniface VIII had since ordered Jacques de Molay to resolve the disputes with Henry II.

In November 1300, Jacques de Molay and the king's brother, Amaury of Lusignan, launched an expedition to reoccupy Tortosa. Six hundred troops, including about 150 Templars, were ferried to Ruad in preparation for a seaborne assault on the city. The hopes were that in synchronization with the naval assault, there would also be a land-based attack by the Mongols of the Ilkhanate, as Ghazan had promised that his own forces would arrive in late 1300. While the Templar Grand Master had high hopes for the operation, the attempt to reoccupy Tortosa lasted only twenty-five days, and the Crusaders acted more like plunderers, destroying property and taking captives. They did not stay permanently in the city, but set up base on Ruad. However, Ghazan's Mongols did not show up as planned, being delayed by the rigorous winter, and the planned junction did not happen.

In February 1301 the Mongols, accompanied by the Armenian king Hethum II, finally made their promised advance into Syria. General Kutlushka went to Little Armenia to fetch troops and from there moved south past Antioch. The Armenians were also accompanied by Guy of Ibelin, Count of Jaffa, and John of Giblet. While Kutlushka had a force of 60,000, he could do little else than engage in some perfunctory raiding as far as the environs of Aleppo. When Ghazan announced that he had canceled his operations for the year, the Crusaders, after some deliberations, decided to return to Cyprus, leaving only a garrison on Ruad.

== Reinforcement of Ruad ==
Crusader troops at Ruad
	November 1300 –January 1301	May 1301 –April 1302
Cypriots	300	500
Templars	150	120
Hospitallers	150	0

From his stronghold of Limassol, in Cyprus, Jacques de Molay continued to send appeals to the West to organize the sending of troops and supplies. In November 1301, Pope Boniface VIII officially granted Ruad to the Knights Templar. They strengthened its fortifications, and installed a force of 120 knights, 500 archers and 400 servants as a permanent garrison. This represented a considerable commitment: "close to half the size of the normal complement [of Templars] for the twelfth-century Kingdom of Jerusalem". They were under the command of the Templar marshal Barthélemy de Quincy.

Plans for combined operations between the Europeans and the Mongols were made for the winters of 1301 and 1302. A surviving letter from Jacques de Molay to Edward I of England, dated 8 April 1301, informed the king of the troubles encountered by Ghazan, but announced de Molay's planned expedition in the autumn:

"And our convent, with all our galleys and tarides (light galleys) [lacuna] has been transported to the isle of Tortosa to await Ghazan's army and his Tartars."

— Jacques de Molay, letter to Edward I, April 8, 1301

In a letter to James II of Aragon a few months later, Jacques de Molay wrote:

"The king of Armenia had sent his messengers to the king of Cyprus to tell him . . . that Ghazan was now on the point of coming to the sultan's lands with a multitude of Tartars. Knowing this, we now intend to go to the isle of Tortosa, where our convent has remained all this year with horses and arms, causing much damage to the casaux along the coast and capturing many Saracens. We intend to go there and settle in to await the Tartars."

— Jacques de Molay, letter to James II of Aragon, 1301.

== Siege ==
Ruad was to be the last Crusader base in the Levant. In 1302, the Mamluks sent a fleet of 16 ships from Egypt, to Tripoli, from which they besieged the island of Ruad. They disembarked at two points and set up their own encampment. The Templars fought the invaders, but were eventually starved out. The Cypriots had been assembling a fleet to rescue Ruad, which set out from Famagusta, but did not arrive in time.

On Ruad, Brother Hugh of Dampierre negotiated a surrender to the Mamluks on September 26, under the condition that they could safely escape to a Christian land of their choice. However after they emerged conflict soon started, Barthélemy de Quincy was killed in the conflict, all the bowmen and Syrian Christian footsoldiers were executed, and dozens of the surviving Templar knights were taken as prisoners to Cairo. About 40 of the Templars were still in prison in Cairo several years later, refusing to apostatize. According to some accounts, they eventually died of starvation after years of ill treatment.

== Aftermath ==
The Franks from Cyprus did continue to engage in some naval attacks along the Syrian coast, destroying Damour, south of Beyrout. Ghazan made a last attack on the Mamluks in Spring 1303, with 30,000 troops in combination with the Armenians, but the expedition ended in disaster. His generals Mulay and Qutlugh Shah were defeated near Damascus at the Battle of Marj al-Saffar on 20 April. It is considered to be the last major Mongol invasion of Syria. When Ghazan died in 1304, Jacques de Molay's dream of a rapid reconquest of the Holy Land was doused.

Subsequently the Grand Master opposed small-scale attacks in anticipation of larger forces as a strategy to recapture the Holy Land. In 1305 Pope Clement V made new plans for a Crusade, and in 1307 received new ambassadors from the Mongol leader Oljeitu, which cheered him "like spiritual sustenance" and encouraged him to evoke the restitution of the Holy Land by the Mongols as a strong possibility. In 1306, Clement asked the leaders of the military orders, Jacques de Molay and Fulk de Villaret, to present their proposals for how the Crusade should proceed, but neither of them factored in any kind of a Mongol alliance. A few later proposals talked briefly about the Mongols as being a force that could invade Syria and keep the Mamluks distracted, but not as a force that could be counted on for cooperation.
