= Gerostratus =

Gerostratus (Ancient Greek: Γηρόστρατος; fl. 4th century BC) was the king of Aradus, a Phoenician island city. He is primarily known for his role during the campaigns of Alexander the Great in the eastern Mediterranean.

At the time of Alexander's advance into Phoenicia following the Battle of Issus, Gerostratus was serving with the Persian fleet under the command of Autophradates, along with other Phoenician rulers. However, as Alexander approached, Gerostratus son, Straton (Στράτων), preemptively submitted to Alexander. Straton met Alexander with gifts, including a golden crown, and offered control of Aradus, as well as all the other places under his own dominion and that of his father, including Marathus and Mariamme.

Shortly thereafter, Gerostratus himself defected from the Persian side and brought his naval forces to support Alexander. He aided Alexander on the Siege of Tyre (332 BC). He joined the Macedonian navy along with ships from other Phoenician rulers and other regions.
