= Siege of Margat =

Part of the Crusades

- Part of the Crusades
Date	17 April – 23 May 1285
Location	Margat, in Syria
Result	Mamluk victory

Belligerents
Knights Hospitaller	Mamluk Sultanate

Commanders and leaders
Hospitaller castellan	Qalawun; Fakr el-Din Mukri

Strength
Unknown	Unknown

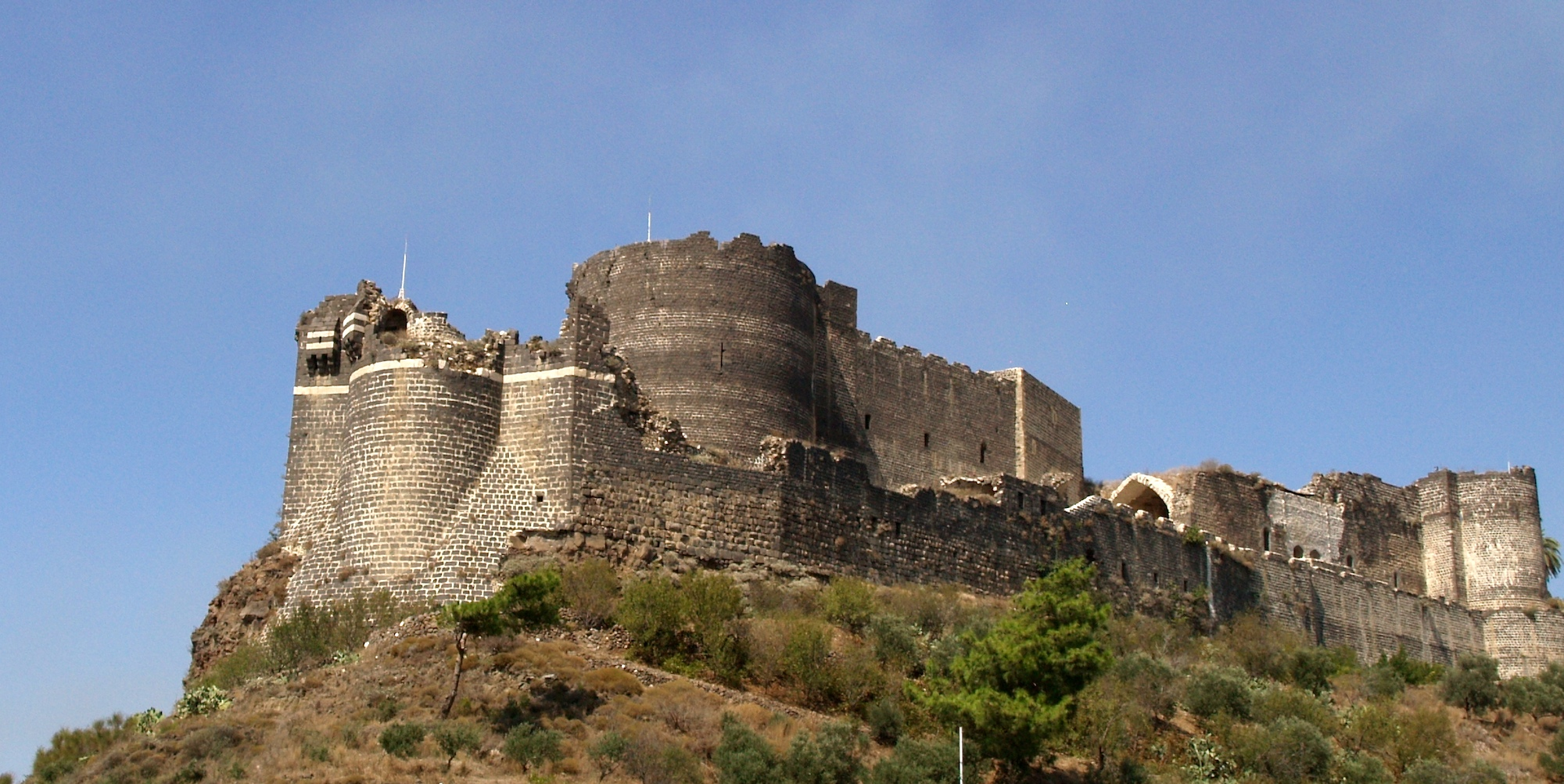
Qalat Marqab (Margat Castle), site of the Siege of Margat, in Northern Syria.

The siege of Margat took place in 1285 and resulted in the Crusaders losing the castle of Margat to the Mamluk Sultanate. The capture of the castle paved the way for the siege of Acre.

== Background ==
Located on the Syrian coast, Margat Castle (also known as Marqab) was a heavily fortified stronghold which was under the control of the Crusaders for 200 years and garrisoned by the Knights Hospitaller. Some Ayyubid and Mamluk sultans of Egypt, including Salah ad-Din (Saladin) and Baybars, tried to conquer it but they were unable to overcome its strong fortifications.

In September 1281, the Hospitallers of Margat dispatched a contingent of troops to support the Mongol invasion of Syria. The invasion was repelled by the Mamluk sultan of Egypt, al-Mansur Qalawun who defeated the coalition at the Second Battle of Homs. To punish the Hospitallers, Qalawun decided to besiege Margat.

== Siege ==
The Mamluk army besieged Margat on 17 April 1285. The 14th-century writer Ibn Aybak al-Dawadari reports:

Sultan al-Mansur entered with all the Egyptian armies, and ordered the army of Damascus to go out towards the fort of al-Marqab, then the catapults were fired, and he descended on it with all the armies, and the siege and war took place, and the people suffered great hardship against it.

The siege was difficult and many of the attackers were killed by arrows and projectiles fired from the castle. Qalawun had brought a large number of engineers, approximately 1,500, who undermined the castle with tunnels. On 23 May, after setting fire to the mines, they successfully destroyed the Tower of the Spur, one of the main towers at the outer southern end of the castle, and breached some of the inner walls. The collapse took the defenders by surprise and caused them heavy casualties. After this, the garrison realized that further resistance was pointless and they asked for terms the next day.

The surrender was made to the Mamluk commander Fakr el-Din Mukri, with Sultan Qalawun entering Margat two days later. Qalawun provided generous terms and allowed the Hospitaller forces to leave in honor, with some of their knights being permitted to ride out in armor. They were permitted to withdraw to Tripoli and Tortosa (Tartus).

This was considered by many historians, most notably historian James Waterson, to be at the pinnacle of military morality and military honor. He says:

"The Hospitallers were allowed an honorable retreat to Tripoli."

== Aftermath ==
Qalawun ordered that the castle be garrisoned by Mamluk engineers due to its strategic importance. He ordered that the castle be rebuilt in even more strongly fortified than before. After the conquest of Margat Castle, the neighboring Maraclea (Maraqiya) castle was shortly conquered after.

The fall of Margat Castle meant that the way to Acre was opened to the Mamluk army. Acre was conquered by Qalawun's successor, al-Ashraf Khalil, a few years later in 1291, thus ending the Crusader presence in the Levant.
