= Reyhanlı =

- District and municipality
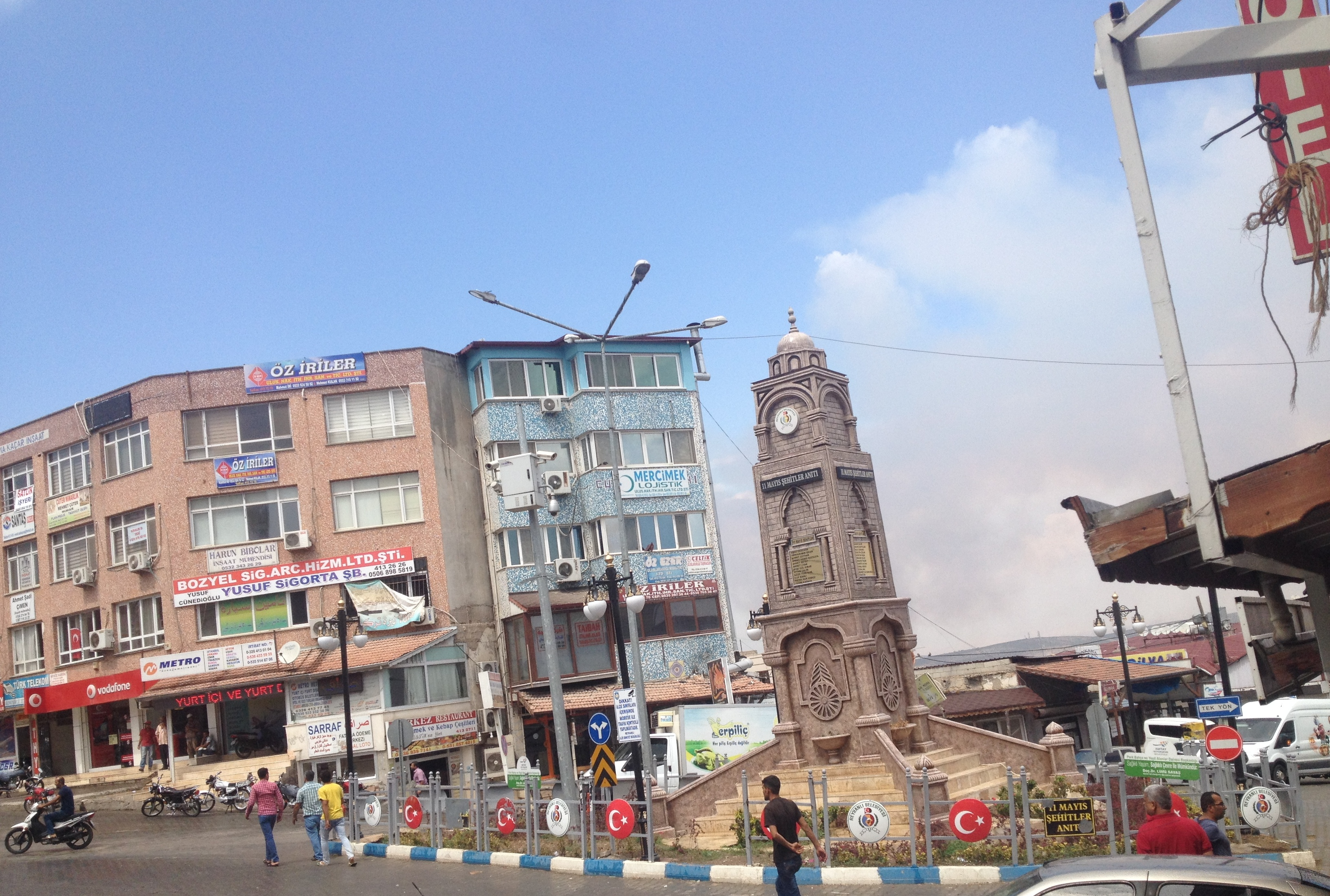
- Reyhanlı city center

- Logo

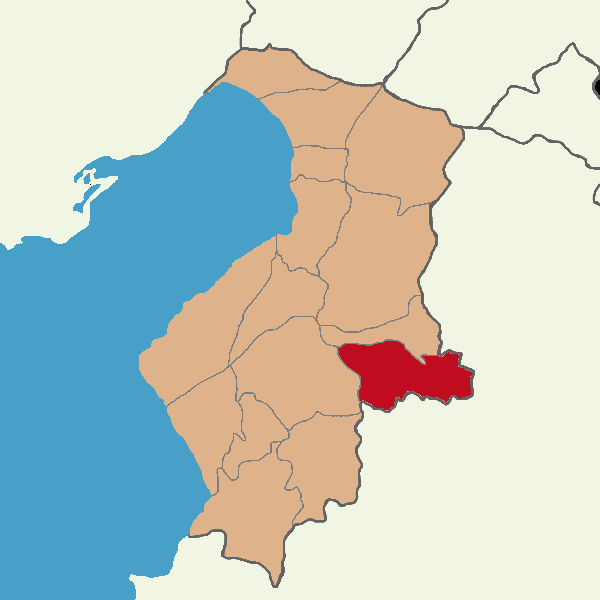
- Map showing Reyhanlı District in Hatay Province

- Location within Turkey
- Coordinates: 36°16′5″N 36°34′3″E
- Country: Turkey
- Province: Hatay

Government
  - Mayor: Ahmet Yumuşak (AKP)
- Area: 367 km^{2} (142 sq mi)
- Elevation: 158 m (518 ft)
- Population (2022): 108,092
  - Density: 295/km^{2} (763/sq mi)
- Time zone: UTC+3 (TRT)
- Postal code: 31500
- Area code: 0326
- Website: www.reyhanli.bel.tr

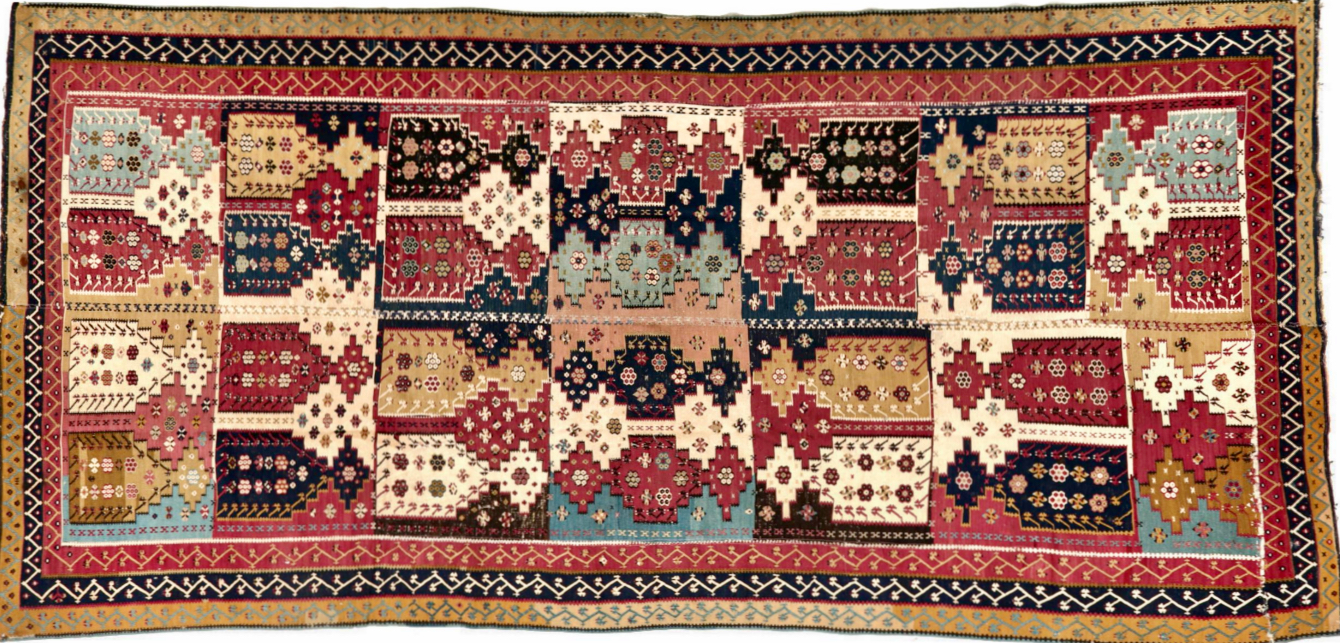
Reyhanli kilim, South Anatolia, mid 19th century

Reyhanlı (pronounced [ɾejˈhanɫɯ]; Arabic: الريحانية, ar-Rayḥānīyah) is a municipality and district of Hatay Province, Turkey. Its area is 367 km^{2}, and its population is 108,092 (2022). It is near the country's border with Syria.

== History ==
Formerly known as İrtah (Artah) and Ar-Rayhaniya, Its southernmost environ, Yenişehir, is thought to be near the ancient village of Imma (or Immae), involved in the Battle of Immae in 272 and probably also with the so-called Battle of Antioch of 218.

The 2013 Reyhanlı car bombings were a terrorist attack that involved the explosion of two car bombs in Reyhanlı on 11 May 2013. 51 people were killed, and 140 more were injured in the attack. The car bombs were left outside Reyhanlı's town hall and post office. The first exploded at around 13:45 local time, (10:45 UTC) and the second exploded about 15 minutes later. People attempting to help those injured in the first explosion were caught in the second blast. At that time, the attack was the deadliest single act of terrorism in the history of modern Turkey, only to be surpassed by the 103 victims of the 2015 Ankara bombings.

On 5 July 2019, another car bombing in the town killed 3 people.

== Geography ==
The climate is typical of the Mediterranean region, and Reyhanlı is an agricultural district watered from Reyhanlı reservoir, growing cotton, wheat and other grains and raising cattle, sheep and goats.

The town lies on the main road between İskenderun and Aleppo in Syria. There is a border crossing point to Bab al-Hawa in Syria at Cilvegözü, 5 kilometres (3 miles) south east of Reyhanlı town, which is the busiest land border post between Turkey and Syria.

== Composition ==
There are 47 neighbourhoods in Reyhanlı District:

- Adabucağı
- Ahmetbeyli
- Akyayla
- Alakuzu
- Bağlar
- Bahçelievler
- Bayır
- Beşaslan
- Bükülmez
- Çakıryiğit
- Cilvegözü
- Cüdeyde
- Cumhuriyet
- Davutpaşahüyüğü
- Değirmenkaşı
- Esentepe
- Fevzipaşa
- Fidanlık
- Gazimürseltepesi
- Göktepe
- Gültepe
- Harran
- Karacanlık
- Karahüyük
- Karasüleymanlı
- Konuk
- Kuletepe
- Kumtepe
- Kurtuluş
- Kuşaklı
- Mehmetbeyli
- Mustafa Kemal
- Nergizli
- Oğulpınar
- Öz Kurtuluş
- Paşahöyük
- Paşaköy
- Pınarbaşı
- Suluköy
- Tayfur Sökmen
- Terzihüyük
- Üçtepe
- Uzunkavak
- Varışlı
- Yeni
- Yenişehir
- Yeşilova
