= 2013 Reyhanlı car bombings =

Terrorist bombings in Turkey

- Location: 36°16′09″N 36°34′02″E; Reyhanlı, Hatay Province, Turkey
- Date: 11 May 2013; 13:45 (EEST)
- Attack type: Dual car bombings
- Deaths: 52
- Injuries: 140
- Accused: Syrian Resistance (per Turkish government)

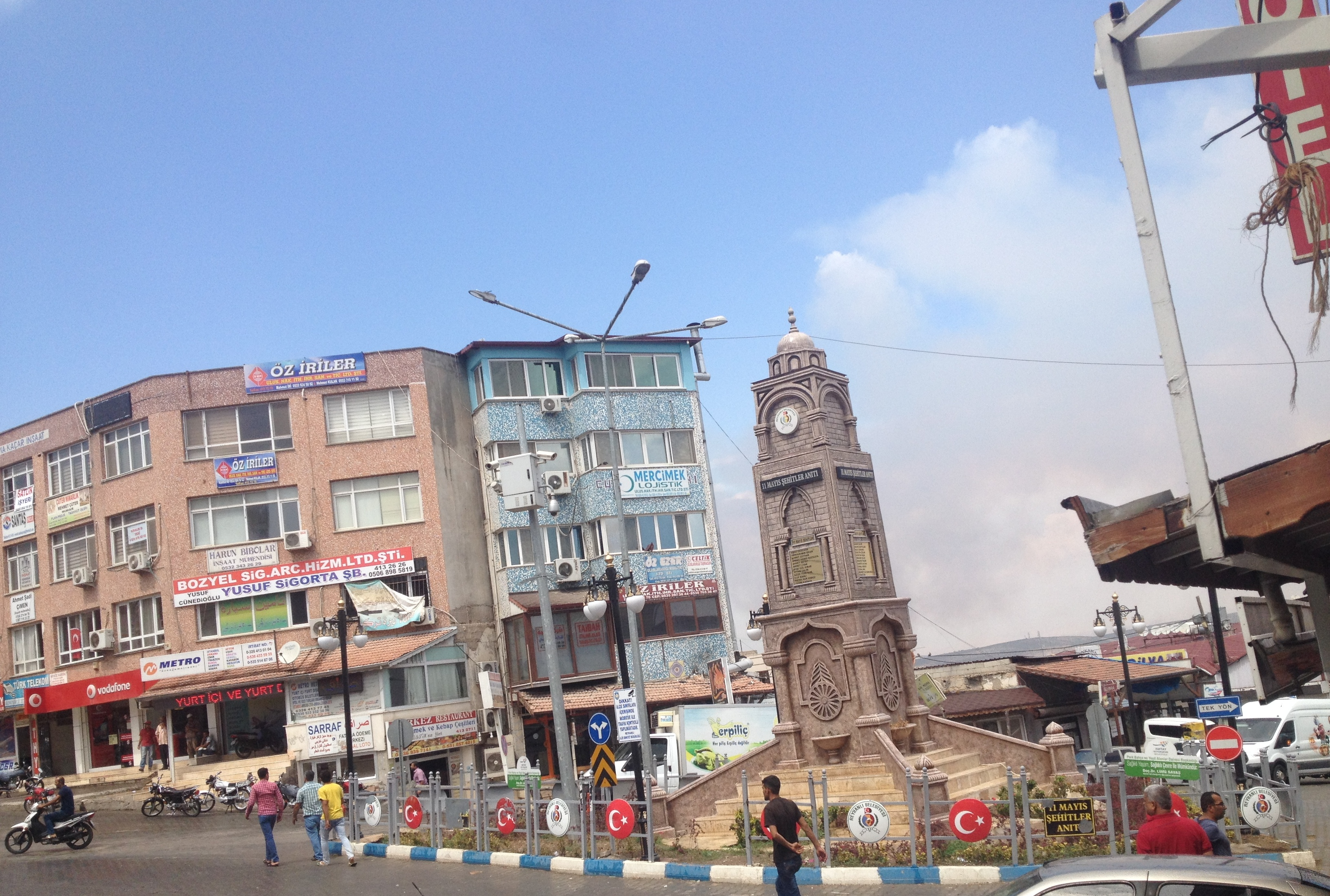
Reyhanlı

On 11 May 2013, two car bombs exploded in the Turkish town of Reyhanlı, a town of 64,000 people, 5 km from the Syrian border and the busiest land border post with Syria, in Hatay Province, Turkey. At least 52 people were killed and 140 injured in the attack.

Turkish authorities accused the government of Syria of being behind the bombings, and within two weeks had charged 12 Turkish nationals who it said were backed by the Syrian government. The state-run Anadolu news agency reported that in February 2018, a Turkish court sentenced nine suspects to life imprisonment and 13 other people to prison terms of 10 to 15 years for the bombings; and that in September 2018 another suspect was captured in Syria and brought to Turkey by Turkish intelligence.

The Syrian government denied responsibility for the attacks. Other groups proposed as culprits include al-Nusra Front, the Islamic State, and Syrian Resistance.

Following the bombings, hundreds of Syrians fled Reyhanli, and some residents blamed the Turkish government for bringing the Syrian Civil War to the town.

== Background ==
Reyhanlı is a town of 64,000 people in the far south of Turkey in Hatay Province, 5 km from the Turkey-Syria border and close to the busiest land border post with Syria, the Bab al-Hawa Border Crossing.

Many Syrian refugees have passed through the town while fleeing from the Syrian Civil War. The nearby Cilvegözü–Bab al-Hawa Border Crossing, which is controlled on the Syrian side by rebels, is the busiest crossing point between the two countries.

On 3 October 2012, mortar fire from Syria killed five people in the Turkish border town of Akçakale. On 11 February 2013, the gate of the Cilvegözü–Bab al-Hawa Border Crossing was the scene of a deadly attack, when an explosion killed 17 people and injured 30 more.

== Bombings ==
Two car bombs were left outside Reyhanlı's town hall and post office. The first exploded at around 13:45 EEST (10:45 UTC), and the second about five minutes later. People attempting to help those injured in the first explosion were caught in the second blast.

A Cumhuriyet journalist reported controversy over the number of fatalities. It was suspected by some news sources that government and local officials had instructed local health care workers to limit the death toll to 50, while the real number was 177.

While some Syrian refugees were caught in the blasts, the majority of the fatalities involved were local Turks. Although there is still no information about the names of the dead, local officials revealed their nationalities, and stated that 5 of 52 people killed by the attacks were Syrian.

== Responsibility ==
Several options have been raised for the responsibility for the attack:

=== Syrian government – Mukhabarat ===
On Saturday, 11 May 2013, Turkey's two Deputy Prime Ministers Bülent Arınç and Besir Atalay said "the Syrian Mukhabarat and armed organizations are the usual suspects in planning and the carrying out of such devilish plans", and Turkish sources accused Syria of being "behind the attacks". Syria, according to information minister Omran al-Zoubi, immediately denied responsibility for the attacks, stating: "Syria [...] would never commit such an act because our values would not allow that."

On 11 May, Turkish authorities said they had detained nine Turks with links to the Syrian Mukhabarat (military intelligence service) as suspects in the bombings.

On 13 May, Prime Minister Recep Tayyip Erdoğan said that he held the Syrian government responsible. By 21 May, Turkey had charged 12 Turkish nationals with the attacks, which they alleged were backed by the Syrian government. On 25 May, Erdogan repeated his accusation that the Syrian regime was behind the attack.

Nasır Eskiocak, a Turkish national captured by the Turkish police on 10 June 2013 and for a while the prime suspect of the attack, said the attack was ordered by the Syrian Mukhabarat, and then organized by him.

On 12 September 2018, the Turkish National Intelligence Organization announced that they had captured Yusuf Nazik, who they alleged is one of the main suspects of the 2013 bombing. He was captured by Turkish intelligence in the Syrian regime-controlled city of Latakia. Nazik, born in the Antakya district of the province of Hatay, confessed in a video-recorded confession that he played a key part in the bombing as a coordinator between the bombers and the Syrian regime, which he said masterminded the attack. He referred to a Syrian intelligence officer named Mohammed, who had the codename "Hadji".

Between 2022 and 2025, Turkish Intelligence captured remaining suspects of the bombing except Mihrac Ural.

=== Al-Nusra Front / al-Qaeda / ISIL ===
- Al-Nusra: Mehmet Ali Ediboğlu (CHP), representing Hatay Province in the Turkish parliament, said on 14 May 2013 he believed the al-Nusra Front (Jabhat al-Nusra) to have planted the bombs, in an attempt "to get Turkey into the war".
- al-Qaeda elements: On 25 May 2013, the Turkish hacker group RedHack alleged that leaked or hacked documents of Turkey's Gendarmerie intelligence department linked al-Qaeda-related groups in Syria to the attack, which was denied by Justice and Development Party (AKP) vice president Hüseyin Çelik. Çelik stated that the documents were leaked by a private using a cell phone but its content is unrelated to the bombings and the private is under arrest.
  On 27 March 2014, also Tacan İldem, Turkey's Ambassador to the OCSE, said 11 May 2013 attack was carried out by "al-Qaeda elements operating out of Syria", which, in May 2013, may have meant either Jabhat al-Nusra or ISIL. That statement was contradicted on 6 April 2014 in a written statement of the Turkish Foreign Ministry who stuck to their conviction that the attack was carried out with support from the Syrian government.
- ISIL: Islamic State of Iraq and the Levant (ISIL) in late September 2013, while threatening Turkey with suicide attacks if Turkey would not reopen its Syrian border crossings at Bab al-Hawa and Bab al-Salameh before 7 October, claimed responsibility for the Reyhanli attack of 11 May 2013.

=== Acilciler versus Turkish government ===
Turkish authorities on 12 May 2013 suspected that former Turkish Marxist group Acilciler, now thought to be based in Syria, might have been revived by his leader Mihrac Ural, and might have ordered the attack. Acilciler was, according to The Huffington Post, long-rumored to have been formed by the Syrian military intelligence service Mukhabarat. The Turkish government on 12 May 2013 believed that Ural and his group, with their ties to pro-government Syrian groups, had carried out the attack. Mihraç Ural, in return, has implicated the Turkish Intelligence Organization.

=== Gülen movement ===
In 2015, former Adana prosecutor Özcan Şişman said in a letter to the Cumhuriyet newspaper that he was warned by MIT officers about a planned bombing attack in 2012 and 2013, three days before the Reyhanli attack. And that he was urged by the officers to carry out an operation against the cell. Şişman said he refused to carry out the operation and did not inform the police. Şişman was arrested in the same year and was sentenced 17 years in prison in 2019 for obtaining and exposing state secrets and being a member of the Gülen movement.

== Aftermath ==
There was widespread panic in Reyhanlı following the blasts, with many people attempting to flee the town. Clashes broke out between Turkish and Syrian people in Reyhanlı, and police were forced to intervene by firing into the air to disperse the crowds. Turkish residents of the town reportedly attacked Syrian refugees and automobiles with Syrian license plates.

BBC Journalist Wyre Davies reported from the site of the bombings in Reyhanli that there was 'real anger' among the people on the streets, not just against whoever had carried out the attacks but also against the government in Ankara. Hundreds of Syrian refugees had been forced to leave, 'scapegoats for the crimes of others' in Davies' account, blamed for bringing the Syrian war to the town. The refugees were held to have made the town a target for Assad's agents in Turkey. The media also were unpopular. "Whoever carried out the bombings has deliberately and successfully driven a wedge between two communities who had always coexisted, even before the war, because of cross-border trade and other historic ties", the journalist wrote.

In response to the attacks, the Turkish government sent large numbers of air and ground forces increasing the already heavy military presence in the area.

Protesters clashed with police in the town on Saturday, 18 May, voicing their anger over the government's response to the attack and its decision to take in Syrian refugees fleeing the Syrian conflict.

Turkey sealed the border with Syria for one month in order to stop possible suspects from escaping.

=== Media ban ===
The Reyhanlı Court of Peace ordered all voice, written, and visual publications referring to the blasts' aftermath banned, including content describing, and images of, the injured and the dead. The court ruled that the written and visual content would jeopardize the confidentiality and outcome of the ongoing prosecution. On 16 May 2013, the Hatay First Criminal Court cancelled the order issued by the Reyhanlı Court of Peace. Only the state-run Anatolia news agency and Turkish Radio and Television Corporation (TRT) were allowed to cover visits by Justice Minister Sadullah Ergin and Health MinisterMehmet Müezzinoğlu to the injured in Antakya State Hospital. When the main opposition leader Kemal Kılıçdaroğlu, of the Republican People's Party (CHP), visited the victims at the same hospital on Monday, only reporters from Anatolia and TRT were allowed to cover Kılıçdaroğlu's visit, while reporters from the Cihan News Agency, the İhlas News Agency and the Doğan News Agency were not allowed to do so.

Several media unions protested the media ban imposed on the Reyhanlı bombings and appealed to the courts to remove the ban immediately. The media ban was condemned by several journalistic organizations in Turkey. Atilla Sertel, the chairperson of the Journalists Federation of Turkey, stated that such bans would cause major misinformation and would result in misleading the public. The Press Institute Association of Turkey claimed the court order upholding the ban was a censure and a major blow to press freedom.

== Reactions ==
=== Domestic ===
Turkish Foreign Minister Ahmet Davutoğlu said, "There may be those who want to sabotage Turkey's peace, but we will not allow that. No one should attempt to test Turkey's power. Our security forces will take all necessary measures." Speaking in Berlin, he said that the bombings were a consequence of global inaction in intervening in the Syrian civil war.

Main opposition leader Kemal Kılıçdaroğlu held Erdogan accountable for the bombings and compared him to Syria's president Assad. Erdogan threatened to sue him in response.

=== International ===
Syrian Information Minister Omran al-Zoubi placed responsibility for the attacks on the Turkish authorities and said, "it was the Turkish government that had facilitated the flow of arms, explosives, vehicles, fighters and money across the border into Syria", and thus "had turned the border areas into centres for international terrorism".

The UN Security Council strongly condemned the Reyhanli bombings, stating, "Any acts of terrorism are criminal and unjustifiable, regardless of their motivation, wherever, whenever and by whomsoever committed." NATO Secretary General Anders Fogh Rasmussen also condemned the attack, calling it "despicable", and said that NATO stood by Turkey.

British Foreign Secretary William Hague issued a Twitter statement saying, "My thoughts are with family and friends of the victims. We stand with the people of Turkey." United States Ambassador Francis Ricciardone stated that the U.S. "strongly condemns today's vicious attack, and stands with the people and government of Turkey to identify the perpetrators and bring them to justice."

== Investigations ==
On 11 May, the authorities had immediately detained nine suspected Turks. By 20 May, 18 people had been detained.

Investigations have revealed that Ankara was the initial target of the recent attacks in Reyhanlı, according to Deputy Prime Minister Beşir Atalay.

In July 2013, several MİT intelligence officials were dismissed for negligence, after an inquiry concluded that MİT had had sufficient information to prevent the attack, but had failed to share it with police quickly enough.

== See also ==
- List of Islamist terrorist attacks
- 2019 Reyhanlı car bombing
- Syria–Turkey relations
- Syrian–Turkish border incidents during the Syrian civil war
- Turkish involvement in the Syrian Civil War
