= Bab al-Hawa Border Crossing =

Border checkpoint between Syria and Turkey

- Coordinates: 36°13′50.3″N 36°41′33.5″E
- Carries: Commercial goods, vehicles
- Crosses: Syria–Turkey border
- Locale: Cilvegözü, Turkey; Bab al-Hawa, Syria
- Official name: Bab al-Hawa Border Crossing معبر باب الهوى

Location
- Interactive map of Bab al-Hawa Border Crossing

The Bab al-Hawa Border Crossing (Arabic: معبر باب الهوى, "Gate of the Winds Crossing") is located on the Syria–Turkey border about 50 km (31 mi) west of Aleppo in northwest Syria. It connects the Syrian M45 and the Turkish D827 highways, between the cities of İskenderun and Idlib, and is known for its long lines of trucks and buses. The closest town on the Turkish side of the border is Reyhanlı in Hatay Province, and the closest towns on the Syrian side are ad-Dana and Atarib. The crossing is the site of a 6th-century triumphal arch. It has been an important crossing for Syrian rebels during the Syrian civil war.

== Archaeology ==
There is a monumental Roman archway in Bab al-Hawa that was part of a city wall. There is a further complex of Byzantine architecture near the archway that has been largely destroyed and re-used in border construction. It features a church and another large rectangular building.

== History ==
=== Syrian civil war ===
During the Syrian civil war, it was a frequent place of crossing for Syrians trying to reach the refugee camp in nearby Reyhanlı. Drivers complained in December 2011 that they had been stalled at the crossing for days after customs officials stopped allowing vehicles with Turkish registrations to enter Syria. The crossing is a major route for smuggling, particularly oil and gas, and during the conflict has seen a dramatic rise in weapons smuggling. On 19 July 2012, Syrian rebels from the Free Syrian Army seized the border and defaced images of then-Syrian President Bashar al-Assad. On 22 July 2012, Turkish armed forces further restricted border crossings of their own nationals.

In September 2012 foreign jihadists raised the Jihadist flag of al-Qaeda at the border post, leading to a confrontation with the Free Syrian Army. On February 11, 2013, a car bomb in a Syrian-registered minivan was detonated on the Turkish side of the crossing meters from the Cilvegözü customs office. Thirteen people—including 3 Turkish civilians—were killed, while 28 others were wounded and 19 vehicles were damaged. The Turkish government labeled the bombing a terrorist act, and said that Turkey's interior, justice and customs ministers would visit the area to help the investigation.

On 7 December 2013, the Islamic Front took the crossing from the Free Syrian Army, and as of July 2014, they were manning the Syrian side with members of the Salafist militia Ahrar ash-Sham. Ahrar a-Sham maintained control when the Islamic Front dissolved in 2015, but established a civilian administration for the border crossing in April 2015.

On 23 July 2017, hundreds of Ahrar al-Sham fighters withdrew with their equipment from the crossing and retreated to Turkey after Hay'at Tahrir al-Sham (HTS) defeated Ahrar al-Sham in Idlib. As a result, the crossing was largely closed by Turkey, with the exception of exports of humanitarian aid and food from Turkey. On 26 July 2017, HTS and Ahrar al-Sham reached an agreement that they would hand over the crossing to a civilian administration so that the flow of humanitarian aid could resume. However, HTS retained control of the towns, villages and roads around it, leaving them in a decisive position. The crossing re-opened on 18 October. In November 2017, civil officials operating the crossing reported that all revenue generated (estimated at $25 million a year in late 2016) goes to the local civil administration. On the 3 March 2020, the US envoy to Syria James Jeffrey, visited the border crossing and supported the Turkish presence in the Idlib Governorate.
