= 2019 Reyhanlı car bombing =

Terrorist incident in Turkey

- Location of Hatay Province in Turkey
- Location: 36°16′09″N 36°34′02″E; Reyhanlı, Hatay Province, Turkey
- Date: 5 July 2019
- Attack type: Car bombing
- Deaths: 3
- Injuries: None

The 2019 Reyhanlı car bombing was a car bombing attack that occurred on 5 July 2019 in the city of Reyhanlı in Hatay Province, Turkey. The blast killed at least three people from Syria.

== Bombing ==
The bombing occurred in a car in the Hatay Province near the border with Syria. The car was carrying citizens from Syria.

== Victims ==
The three victims were Syrian citizens who were inside the car that exploded.

== See also ==
- 2013 Reyhanlı car bombings
- List of terrorist incidents in July 2019
