= Arwad =

Arwad أرواد Aradus
- Town
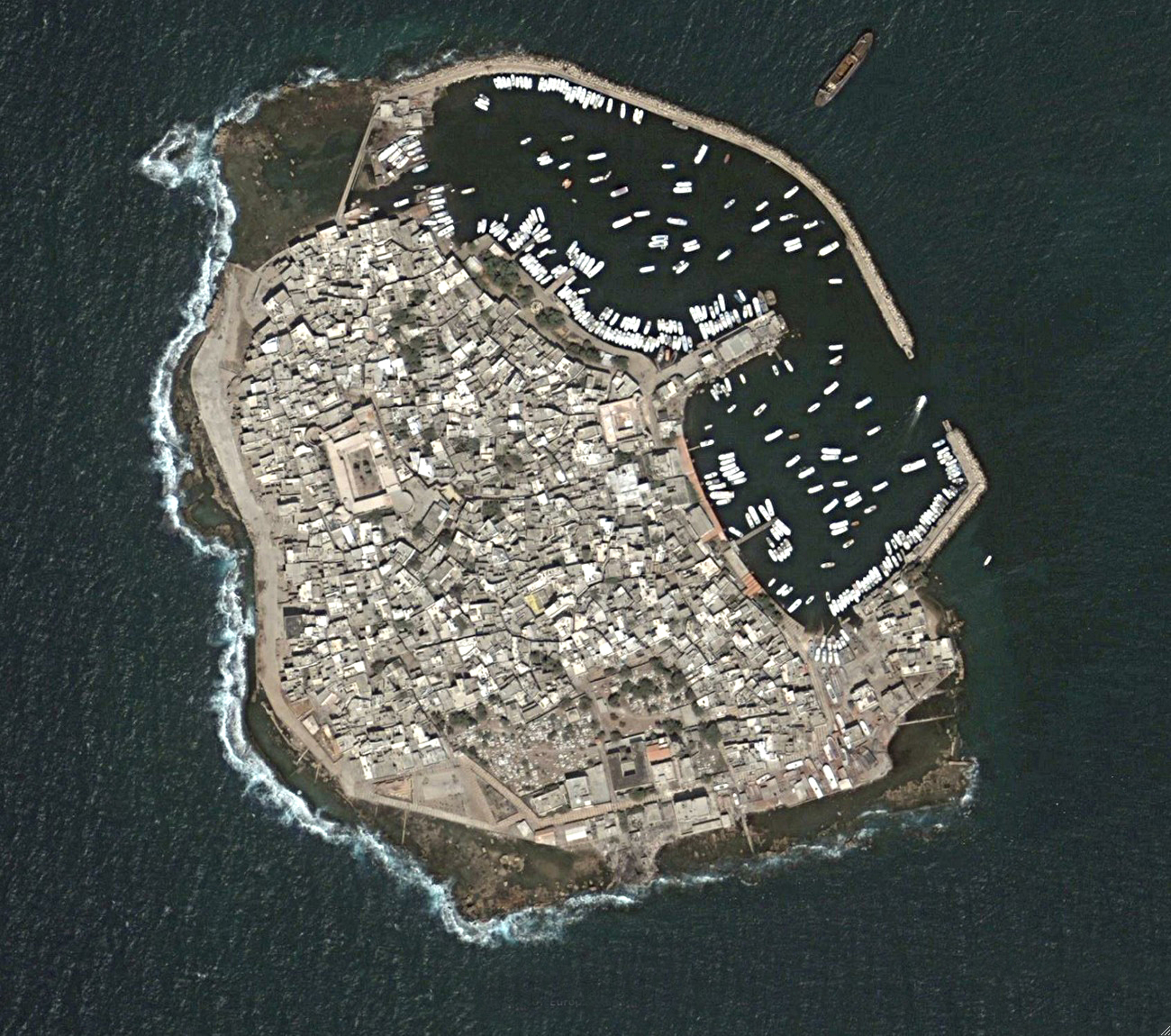
- Satellite image of Arwad

- Location within Syria Location within Eastern Mediterranean
- Coordinates: 34°51′22″N 35°51′32″E
- Country: Syria
- Governorate: Tartus
- District: Tartus
- Subdistrict: Arwad

Area
  - Total: 0.2 km^{2} (0.077 sq mi)

Population (2004 census)
  - Total: 4,403
- Time zone: UTC+2 (EET)
  - Summer (DST): UTC+3 (EEST)
- Area codes: Country code: 963, City code: 43
- Climate: CSa

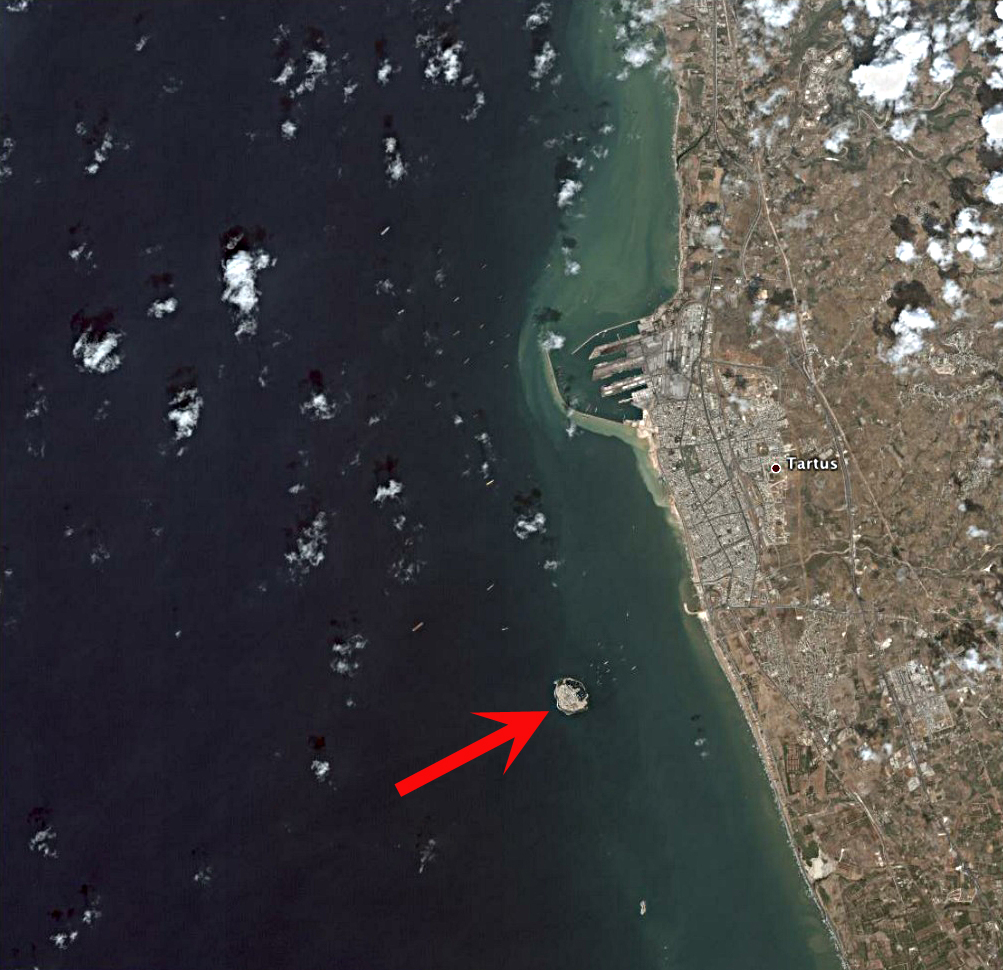
A satellite image of Arwad, with Tartus on the Syrian coast to the east

Arwad (Phoenician: 𐤀𐤓𐤅𐤃, romanized: ʾrwd; Arabic: أرواد, romanized: ʾArwād), the classical Aradus, is a town in Syria on an eponymous island in the Mediterranean Sea. It is the administrative center of the Arwad Subdistrict (nahiyah), of which it is the only locality. It is the only inhabited island in Syria. It is located 3 km (1.9 mi) from Tartus (the ancient Tortosa), Syria's second-largest port.

Today, Arwad is mainly a fishing town. According to the Syria Central Bureau of Statistics, during the 2004 census, it had a population of 4,403, predominantly Arab Sunni Muslims. Plans were unveiled in May 2016 to renovate the island to become a tourist attraction. The island is currently surrounded by ancient Phoenician era walls.

Under clear skies, it is possible to spot Arwad and the outline of Turkish hills and mountains in Hatay from elevated observation points in Northern Mount Lebanon, such as the Bsharri district.

== Etymology ==
i A2 r Z1 ti t w xAst
jrtw
in hieroglyphs
Era: New Kingdom
(1550–1069 BC)

The original Phoenician city was named Arwad Phoenician: 𐤀𐤓𐤅𐤃, romanized: ʾrwd and was located on an island named (𐤀𐤉𐤍𐤊, ʾynk). It is mentioned in the Annals of Thutmose III at the Karnak Temple as jrtw. It eventually became known as Arvad, Arpad, and Arphad. These were hellenized as Árados (Ancient Greek: Ἄραδος), which was Latinized as Aradus. In Arabic, it became Arwad (أرواد).

Under the Seleucid Empire, Antiochus I renamed it Antioch after himself or the father of Seleucus the Great. It was distinguished from several other cities of that name as Antioch or Antiochia in Pieria (Ancient Greek: Ἀντιόχεια τῆς Πιερίας, romanized: Antiókheia tês Pierías).

Its site was also known as Ruad Island and Ile Rouad under the French occupation and mandate from 1916 to 1945. Postage stamps were issued in 1916 in the latter name.

== History ==
=== Ancient history ===
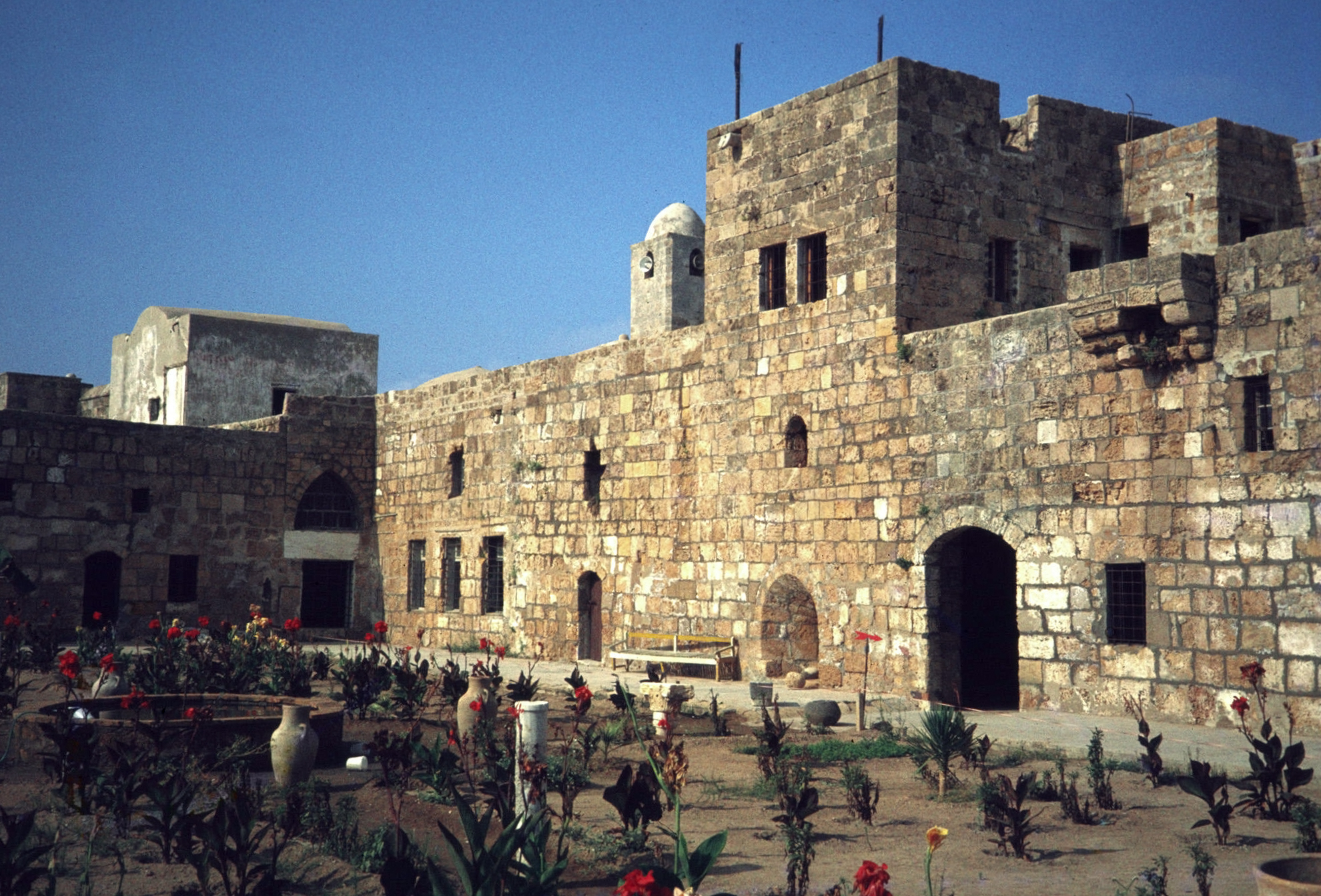
The fortress of Arwad

Arwad has been continuously inhabited since at least the 3rd millennium BC. it was mentioned in the archive of the Royal Palace of Ebla, then at Alalakh.

The island was settled in the early 2nd millennium BC by the Phoenicians. Located some 50 kilometres (31 mi) north of Tripoli, it was a barren rock covered with fortifications and houses several stories in height. The island was about 800 m long by 500 m wide, surrounded by a massive wall, and an artificial harbor was constructed on the east toward the mainland. It developed into a trading city in early times, as did most of the Phoenician cities on this coast. It had a powerful navy, and its ships are mentioned in the monuments of Egypt and Assyria. In the Bible, an "Arvad" is noted as the forefather of the "Arvadites", a Canaanite people. The Phoenicians collected rain water in cisterns and shipped fresh water to the island, eventually discovering an undersea freshwater spring nearby.

The city of Arwad seems to have had a sort of hegemony over the northern Phoenician cities, from the mouth of the Orontes to the northern limits of Lebanon, something like that of Sidon in the south. It brought under its authority some of the neighboring cities on the mainland, such as Marat (present-day Amrit) and Sumur, the former nearly opposite the island and the latter some kilometers to the south. It had its own local dynasty and coinage, and some of the names of its kings have been recovered.

=== Egyptian Period ===
Thutmose III of Egypt took it in his campaign in north Syria (1472 BC), and it is noticed in the campaigns of Ramesses II in the early part of the 13th century BC.

It is also mentioned in the Amarna letters as being in league with the Amorites in their attacks on the Egyptian possessions in Syria.

About 1200 BC or a little later, it was sacked by invaders from Asia Minor or the islands, as were most of the cities on the coast. but it recovered when they were driven back.

=== Assyrian period ===
Its maritime importance is indicated by the inscriptions of the Assyrian kings. Tiglath-pileser I (c. 1020 BC) boasts that he sailed in the ships of Arwad. Ashurnasirpal II (c. 876 BC) made it tributary, but it revolted and 200 men of Arwad were mentioned among the allies of Hadadezer of Aram Damascus at the Battle of Qarqar, when all Syria seems to have been in league against Shalmaneser III (c. 854). At this time, the king of Arwad was Mattan Baal. It was afterward tributary to Tiglath-pileser III and Sennacherib; under Sennacherib, its king was Abd-Ilihit c. 701. Ashurbanipal (c. 664) compelled its king Yakinlu to submit and send one of his daughters to become a member of the royal harem.

=== Persian period ===
Under the Persians, Arwad was allowed to unite in a confederation with Sidon and Tyre, with a common council at Tripolis. The Book of Ezekiel refers to its seamen and soldiers in the service of Tyre.

=== Alexander the Great and Hellenistic period ===
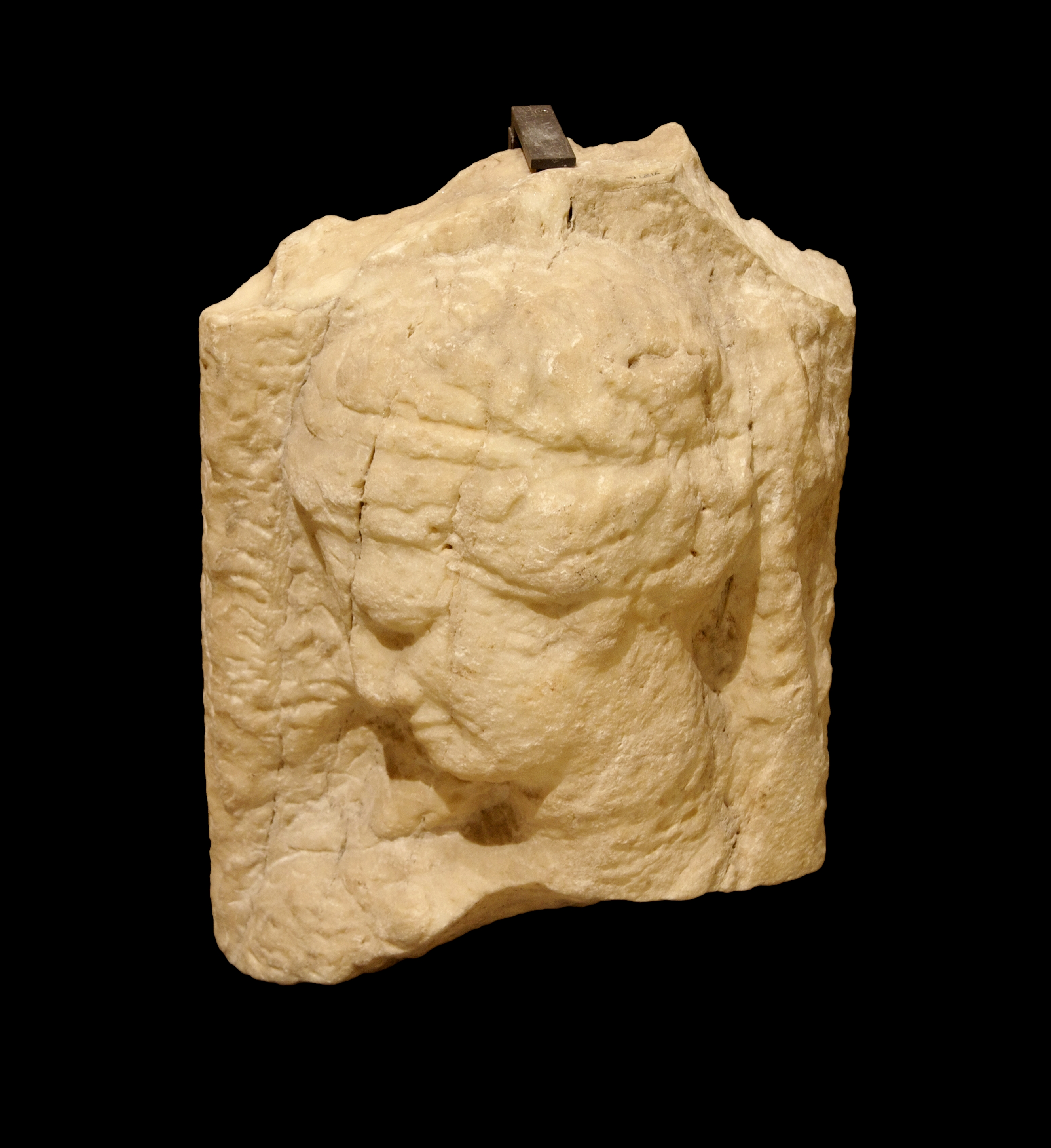
Fragment of a 4th-century BC stele found in Arwad. Musée du Louvre.

When Alexander the Great invaded Syria in 332 BC, the king of Arwad, Gerostratus, and his son Straton submitted to him without resistance and sent their navy to support his Siege of Tyre. It seems to have received the favor of the Seleucid kings of Syria and enjoyed the right of asylum for political refugees. It is mentioned in a rescript from Rome about 138 BC in connection with other cities and rulers of the East, to show favor to the Jews. This was after Rome had begun to interfere in the affairs of Judea and Syria and indicates that Arwad was still of considerable importance at that time.

The city has been cited as one of the first known examples of a republic in the Levant region, in which the people, rather than a monarch, are described as sovereign. The island was important as a base for commercial ventures into the Orontes valley.

Arwad inaugurated a new civic era in 259 BC, when its traditional royalty disappeared, and it became a free independent city within the Seleucid kingdom, during the reign of Antiochus II.

=== Roman period ===
In Roman times, Arwad fiercely resisted Mark Antony when he came to Syria to find money there. When the city refused to co-operate, it was besieged in 38 BC, then eventually surrendered, which marked the end of its independence in 34–35 BC.

=== Bishopric ===
The city of Aradus, as it was then called, became a Christian bishopric. Athanasius reports that, under Roman Emperor Constantine the Great, Cymatius, the Chalcedonian bishop of Aradus and also of Antaradus (whose names indicate that they were neighbouring towns facing each other) was driven out by the Arians. At the First Council of Constantinople in 381, Mocimus appears as bishop of Aradus. At the time of the Council of Ephesus (431), some sources speak of a Musaeus as bishop of Aradus and Antaradus, while others mention only Aradus or only Antaradus. Alexander was at the Council of Chalcedon in 451 as bishop of Antaradus, Paulus as bishop of Aradus, while, at a synod held at Antioch shortly before, Paulus took part as bishop of both Aradus and Antaradus.

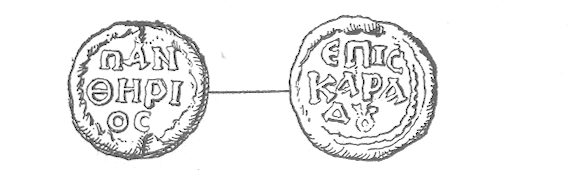
Seal of Pantherios, bishop of Aradus (5th/6th century)

In 458, Atticus signed, as bishop of Aradus, the letter of the bishops of the province of Phoenicia Prima to Byzantine Emperor Leo I the Thracian protesting about the murder of Proterius of Alexandria. Theodorus or Theodosius, who died in 518, is mentioned as bishop of Antaradus in a letter from the bishops of the province regarding Severus of Antioch that was read at a synod held by Patriarch Mennas of Constantinople. The acts of the Second Council of Constantinople in 553 were signed by Asyncretius as bishop of Aradus. At the time of the Crusades, Antaradus, by then called Tartus or Tortosa, was a Latin Church diocese, whose bishop also held the titles of Aradus and Maraclea (perhaps Rachlea).

It was united to the see of Famagusta in Cyprus in 1295. No longer a residential bishopric, Aradus is today listed by the Catholic Church as a titular see.

=== Medieval history ===
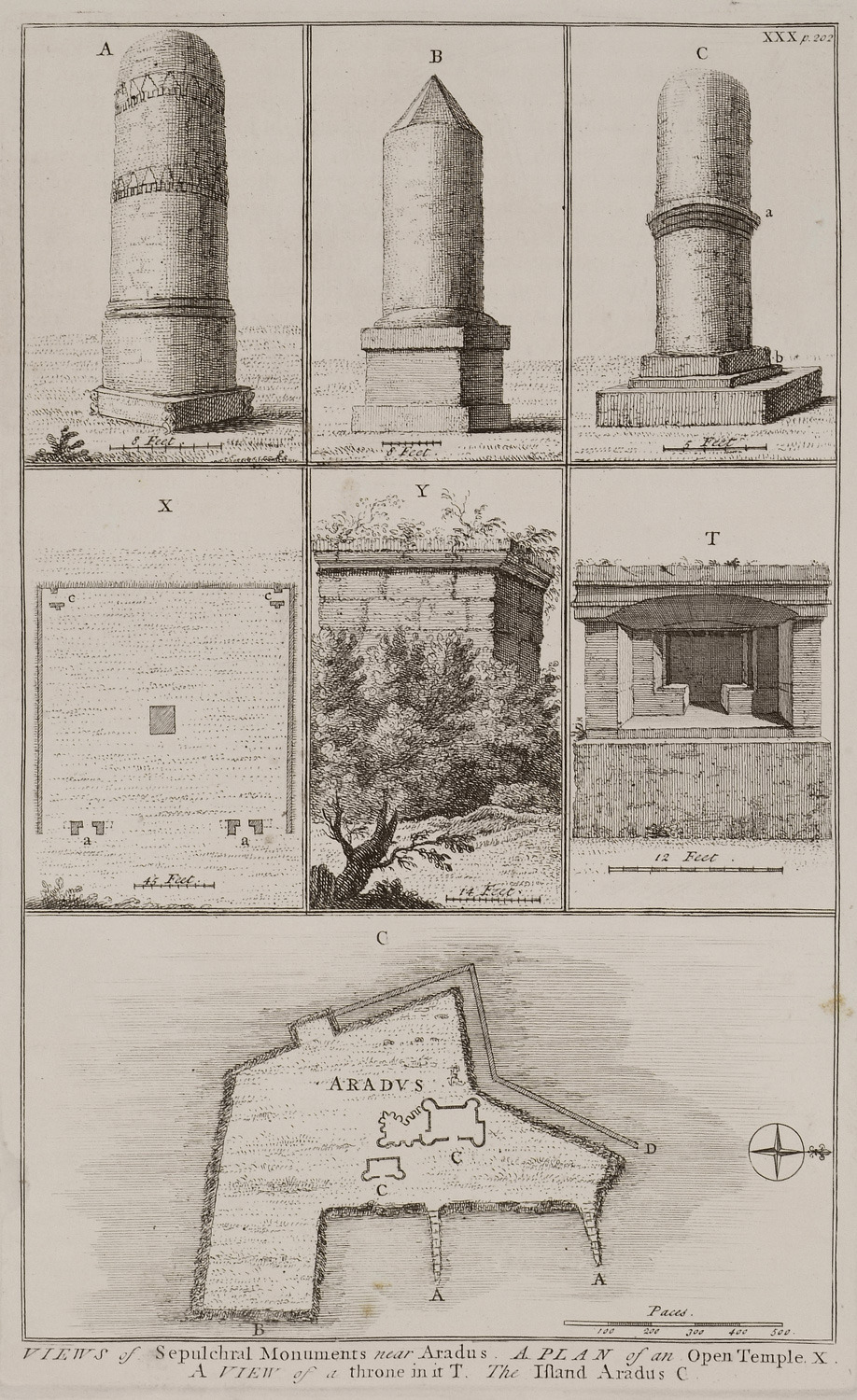
"Views of Sepulchral Monuments near Aradus", Richard Pococke, 1745

During the later part of the 13th century, in the time of the Crusades, the island of Ruad was used as a bridgehead or staging area by the Crusaders. It was the last piece of land that the Crusaders maintained in the Holy Land.

The Crusaders had lost control of the mainland in 1291 (see Fall of Acre), and the dwindling Kingdom of Jerusalem had been relocated to the island of Cyprus. In early 1300, in an attempt to coordinate military operations with the Mongol leader Ghazan, the Cypriots prepared a land-based force of approximately 600 men: 300 under Amalric of Lusignan, son of Hugh III of Cyprus, and similar contingents from the Templars and Hospitallers. The men and their horses were ferried from Cyprus to a staging area on Ruad, from which they launched raids on Tortosa while awaiting Mongol reinforcements. When the Mongols failed to arrive, the majority of the Christian forces returned to Cyprus, though a garrison was left on Ruad which was manned by rotating groups of different Cypriot forces. Pope Clement V formally awarded ownership of the island to the Knights Templar, who (in 1302) maintained a garrison with 120 knights, 500 bowmen and 400 Syrian helpers, under the Templar Maréchal (Commander-in-Chief) Barthélemy de Quincy.

In February 1301, the Mongols did arrive with a force of 60,000, but could do little else than engage in some raids around Syria. The Mongol leader Kutluqa stationed 20,000 horsemen in the Jordan Valley to protect Damascus, where a Mongol governor was installed. Soon however, they had to withdraw.

The Egyptian Mamluks, who had been systematically re-establishing control over Palestine and Syria, sought to take Ruad as well. A Mamluk fleet landed a force on the island, engaging in combat with the entrenched Templars, and then establishing a lengthy siege, culminating with the Fall of Ruad, and the Crusaders surrendering on September 26, 1302, following a promise of safe conduct. However, the promise was not honored: all the bowmen and Syrian helpers were killed, and the Templar knights were sent to Cairo prisons.

=== Contemporary era ===
During WWI, the island was occupied by the French navy on 1 September 1915, under the leadership of Admiral Louis Dartige du Fournet, including warships such as Jauréguiberry, Jeanne d'Arc and D'Estrées. Later on, Albert Trabaud was appointed as its governor. Afterwards, the island was bombed by the Ottomans in November 1917, but their attack was repulsed by French sailors.

Under the French Mandate the dungeons of the fortress were used as a prison for those opposing French rule, as the captives' still-visible graffiti attest.

In 1945, at the end of WWII, France wanted to preserve the island, hence started working to build a military base, in a geopolitical framework, to maintain a military position in the region, and to keep a cultural influence. But as a result of pressure from the United States, the island was ceded unconditionally to Syria at the end of 1945, a decision confirmed in 1946.

During the later half of the 20th century and the 21st century, the island's economy became more reliant on tourism, fishing and boatbuilding. This tourism focused economy was greatly impacted by the Syrian Civil War, due to the decreased travel to Syria. However, there has been no conflict on the island during the war, and it has been controlled by government forces from the beginning of the war until the fall of the Assad regime on December 8, 2024. Despite this, at least 20 islanders have lost their life in the course of the war. The COVID-19 pandemic has also affected the island's economy, further weakening the tourism industry, with many local businesses losing potential tourist related income.

== See also ==
- Arad, Bahrain
- Arvada, Colorado
- Cities of the ancient Near East
- List of Crusader castles
- List of islands of Syria

== References and sources ==
=== Sources ===
- Malcolm Barber, Trial of the Templars
- Martin Bernal, Black Athena Writes Back (Durham: Duke University Press, 2001), 359.
- Lawrence I Conrad, ‘The Conquest of Arwād: A Source-critical study in the historiography of the early medieval Near East’, in The Byzantine and early Islamic Near East: Papers of the First Workshop on Late Antiquity and Early Islam, edited by Averil Cameron and Lawrence I Conrad, Studies in late antiquity and early Islam, 1, vol. 1, Problems in the literary source material (Princeton: Darwin Press, 1992), 317–401.
- Alain Demurger, The Last Templar
- Hazlitt, The Classical Gazetteer, p. 53.
- Lebling, Robert W. 2016. "Arwad, Fortress at Sea". Aramco World. January February 2016. Volume 67, no. 1. Pages 34–41.
- Newman, Sharan (2006). Real History Behind the Templars. Berkley Publishing Group. ISBN 978-0-425-21533-3.
- Jean Richard, Les Croisades
- Sylvia Schein, "Gesta Dei per Mongolos"
- Dave Eggers, Zeitoun
- Krahmalkov, Charles R (2000). Phoenician-Punic dictionary. Peeters Publishers.
