= Baniyas =

City in Tartous Governorate, Syria

Baniyas بَانِيَاس Balaneais, Balanaea, Balanea, Leucas, Leucas-Claudia
- City
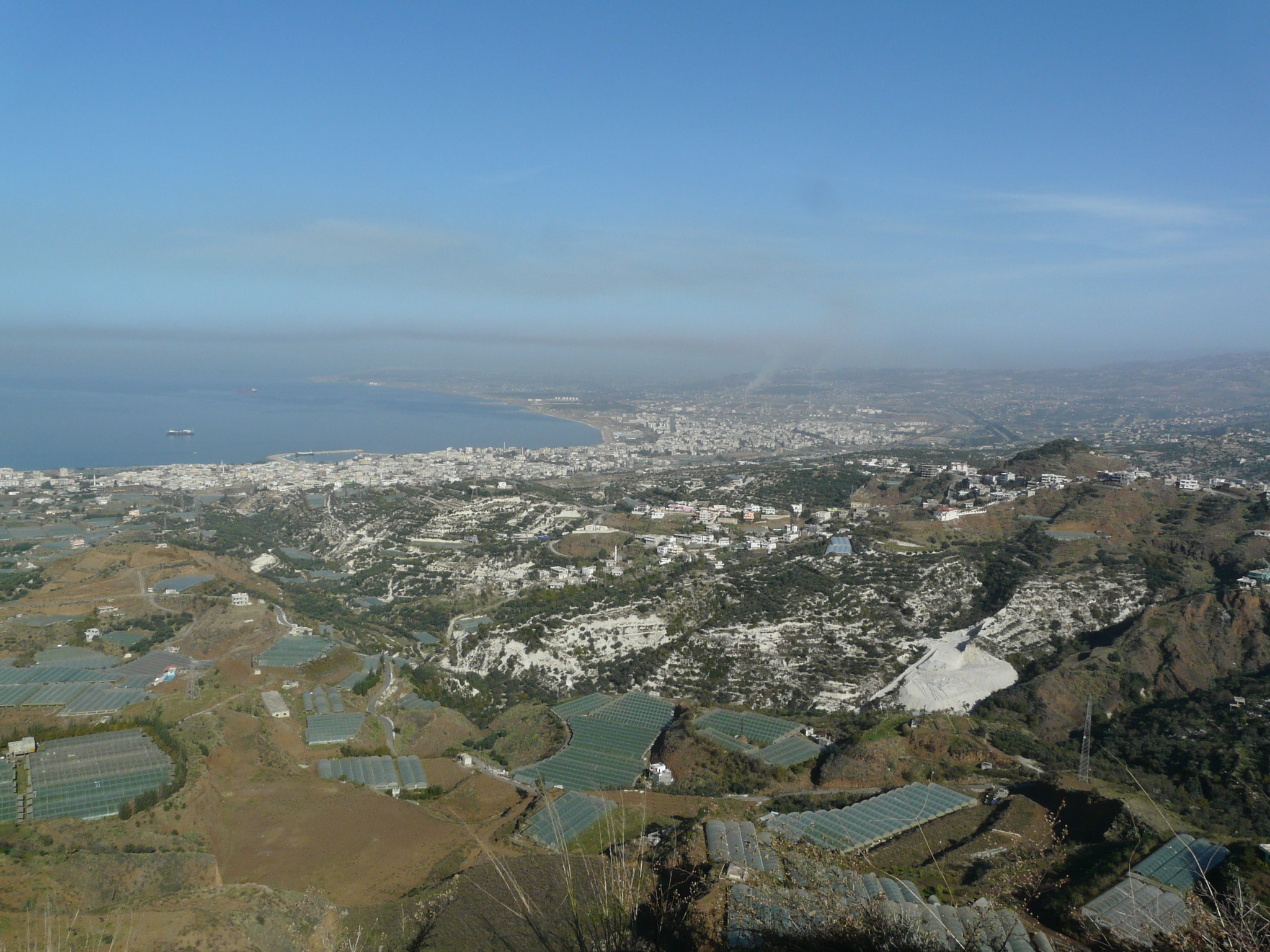
- General view of city

- Location in Syria
- Coordinates: 35°10′56″N 35°56′25″E
- Country: Syria
- Governorate: Tartus
- District: Baniyas
- Subdistrict: Baniyas
- Elevation: 25 m (82 ft)

Population (2009 est.)
  - Total: 43,000
- Time zone: UTC+2 (EET)
  - Summer (DST): UTC+3 (EEST)
- Area code: 43
- Geocode: C5360
- Climate: Csa

Baniyas (Arabic: بَانِيَاس Bāniyās) is a Mediterranean coastal city in Tartus Governorate, western Syria, located 55 km (34 mi) south of Latakia and 35 km (22 mi) north of Tartus. Its ancient name was Balaneais, Balanaea or Balanea but it was also called Leucas or Leucas-Claudia.

It is known for its citrus fruit orchards and its export of wood. North of the city is an oil refinery, the largest in Syria, and a power station. The oil refinery is connected with Iraq by the Kirkuk–Baniyas pipeline (defunct since the US-led 2003 invasion of Iraq).

On a nearby hill stands the Crusader castle of Margat (Qalʻat al-Marqab), a huge Knights Hospitaller fortress built with black basalt stone.

== History ==
=== Ancient ===
In Phoenician and Hellenistic times, it was an important seaport. Some have identified it with the Hellenistic city of Leucas (from colonists from the island Lefkada), in Greece, mentioned by Stephanus of Byzantium. It was a colony of Aradus, and was placed by Stephanus in the late Roman province of Phoenicia, though it belonged rather to the province of Syria. In Greek and Latin, it is known as Balanaea or Balanea (Βαλανέαι).

=== Modern ===
During the early 21st century Syrian civil war, rebel sources reported that a massacre took place on 2 May 2013, perpetrated by regime forces. On 3 May, another massacre was, according to SOHR, perpetrated in the Ras al-Nabaa district of Baniyas causing hundreds of Sunni residents to flee their homes. According to one opposition report, a total of 77 civilians, including 14 children, were killed. Another two opposition groups documented, by name, 96–145 people who are thought to have been executed in the district. Four pro-government militiamen and two soldiers were also killed in the area in clashes with rebel fighters.

==== 2025 massacres ====
After the overthrow of the Assad regime in late 2024, several massacres were occurring throughout the country with the most notable recent incident on the coast affecting several areas, including Baniyas city. From 6 March 2025, according to the UK-based Syrian Observatory for Human Rights (SOHR), over 1,000 people were killed in clashes between militias loyal to the HTS and militias loyal to the deposed president Bashar al-Assad, including more than 745 confirmed civilian deaths caused by the current government forces and the Syrian security forces. The massacres occurring negatively affected the Alawite population in the area causing many to flee.

== Climate ==
Baniyas has a hot-summer Mediterranean climate (Köppen climate classification Csa). Rainfall is higher in winter than in summer. The average annual temperature in Baniyas is 19.3 °C (66.7 °F). About 862 mm (33.94 in) of precipitation falls annually.

Climate data for Baniyas
Month	Jan	Feb	Mar	Apr	May	Jun	Jul	Aug	Sep	Oct	Nov	Dec	Year
Mean daily maximum °C (°F)	15.0 (59.0)	16.1 (61.0)	18.7 (65.7)	22.3 (72.1)	25.9 (78.6)	29.1 (84.4)	30.7 (87.3)	31.6 (88.9)	30.3 (86.5)	27.5 (81.5)	22.6 (72.7)	16.8 (62.2)	23.9 (75.0)
Mean daily minimum °C (°F)	7.6 (45.7)	8.0 (46.4)	9.9 (49.8)	12.5 (54.5)	15.6 (60.1)	19.3 (66.7)	21.9 (71.4)	22.2 (72.0)	19.9 (67.8)	17.3 (63.1)	12.6 (54.7)	9.2 (48.6)	14.7 (58.4)
Average precipitation mm (inches)	159 (6.3)	147 (5.8)	123 (4.8)	50 (2.0)	26 (1.0)	2 (0.1)	1 (0.0)	1 (0.0)	12 (0.5)	49 (1.9)	94 (3.7)	198 (7.8)	862 (33.9)
Source: Climate-Data.org, Climate data

== Bishopric ==
The bishopric of Balanea was a suffragan of Apamea, the capital of the Roman province of Syria Secunda, as is attested in a 6th-century Notitiae Episcopatuum. When Justinian established a new civil province, Theodorias, with Laodicea as metropolis, Balanea was incorporated into it, but continued to depend ecclesiastically on Apamea, till it obtained the status of an exempt bishopric directly subject to the Patriarch of Antioch.

Its first known bishop, Euphration, took part in the Council of Nicaea in 325 and was exiled by the Arians in 335 later Timotheus was at both the Robber Council of Ephesus in 449 and the Council of Chalcedon in 451. In 536, Theodorus was one of the signatories of a letter to the emperor Justinian against Severus of Antioch and other non-Chalcedonians. Stephanus participated in the Second Council of Constantinople in 553.

During the Crusades, Balanea became an episcopal see of the Latin Church, called Valenia or Valania in the West. It was situated within the Principality of Antioch and was suffragan to the Latin metropolitan see of Apamea, whose archbishop intervened in the nomination of bishops of the suffragan see in 1198 and 1215. For reasons of security, the bishop lived in Margat Castle.

No longer a residential bishopric, Balanea is today listed by the Catholic Church as a titular see.

== People ==
- Anas Al-Sheghri (born 1988), a Syrian civil war activist.

== See also ==
- List of Crusader castles
