= Mehmet Şandır =

Turkish politician (born 1947)

Mehmet Şandır (born in 1947, in Bayırbucak, Syria) is a Turkish politician. He is a former MP of the Turkish Nationalist Movement Party, and is currently an Honorary President of the Syrian Turkmen Assembly.

== Early life and career ==
Şandır was born in 1947 in Bayırbucak, Syria, to Syrian Turkmen parents Hasan and Atika Şandır. He graduated from Istanbul University in the Faculty of Forestry. Şandır served as the Turkish Minister of Forest and Water Management and then the Minister of Customs and Trade.

== Personal life ==
Şandır is married and has three children.
