= Talal Silo =

Syrian army colonel and SDF spokesman (2014–2017)

Talal Silo طلال سلو
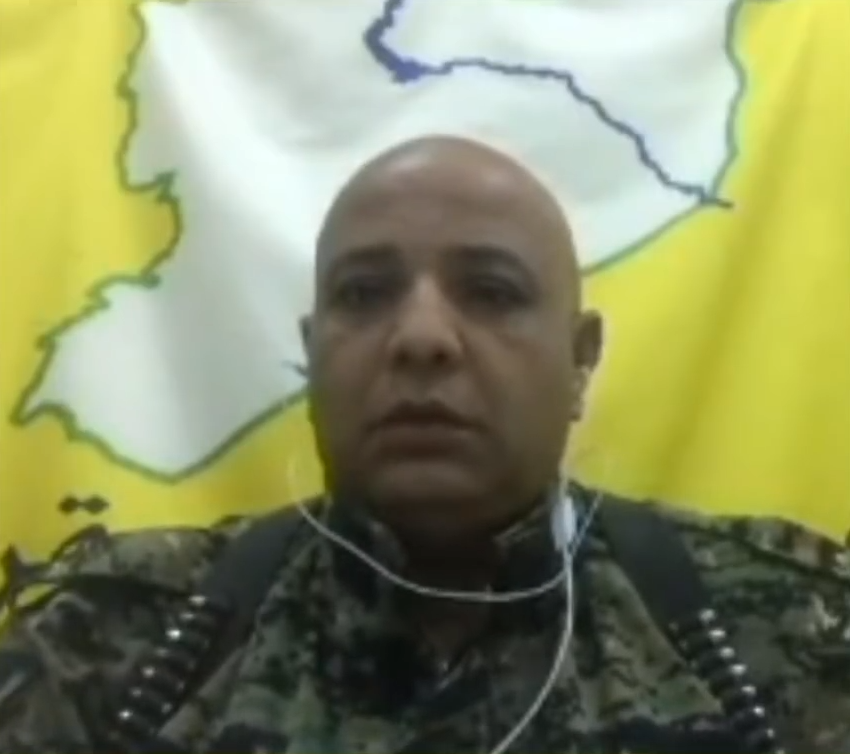
- Silo in 2016
- Born: طلال علي سلو (Talal Ali Silo); 1965 (age 60–61); Al-Rai, Syria
- Military career
- Allegiance: (Ba'athist Syria) Syrian Arab Republic (1985–2004); Syrian opposition (2013–2015, since 2017); Autonomous Administration of North and East Syria (2015–2017)
- Branch: Syrian Arab Armed Forces (1985–2004); Syrian Turkmen Assembly (2013–2015); Syrian Democratic Forces (2015–2017)
- Rank: Colonel
- Units: Seljuk Brigade (2013–2015); Army of Revolutionaries (2015)
- Commands: Spokesman of the Syrian Democratic Forces (2015–17); Commander of the Seljuk Brigade (2013–15)
- Conflicts: Syrian Civil War; Inter-rebel conflict during the Syrian Civil War; 2015 al-Hawl offensive; Tishrin Dam offensive; Al-Shaddadi offensive (2016); Manbij offensive (2016); Turkish military intervention in Syria; Raqqa campaign (2016–2017); Battle of Raqqa (2017)

Talal Silo (Arabic: طلال سلو; also transliterated Telal Silo, Talal Sallou) is a Syrian Turkmen former military personnel who was the official Syrian Democratic Forces (SDF) spokesperson from 2014 until his surrender or defection to Turkey in November 2017, covering major SDF operations and battles against the militant group ISIL. His departure marked the first major defection among the SDF's top ranks.

During an interview, he claimed that during the SDF's capture of Raqqa from ISIL, thousands of ISIL fighters—far more than initially reported—left the city as part of a secret agreement approved by the United States. However, U.S. officials dismissed Silo's statements as “false and fabricated.” The agreement is considered by some as a strategic maneuver by the SDF and coalition forces. The U.S.-backed Syrian Democratic Forces (SDF) and the Syrian National Army (SNA) have offered differing accounts regarding the reasons for Silo's departure, highlighting the ongoing complexities of the Syrian Civil War.

== See also ==
- Seljuk Brigade
- Syrian Democratic Forces
