= Syrian Turkmen Brigades =

Syrian Turkmen paramilitary

United Turkmen Army
- Birleşik Türkmen Ordusu الجيش التركماني الموحد
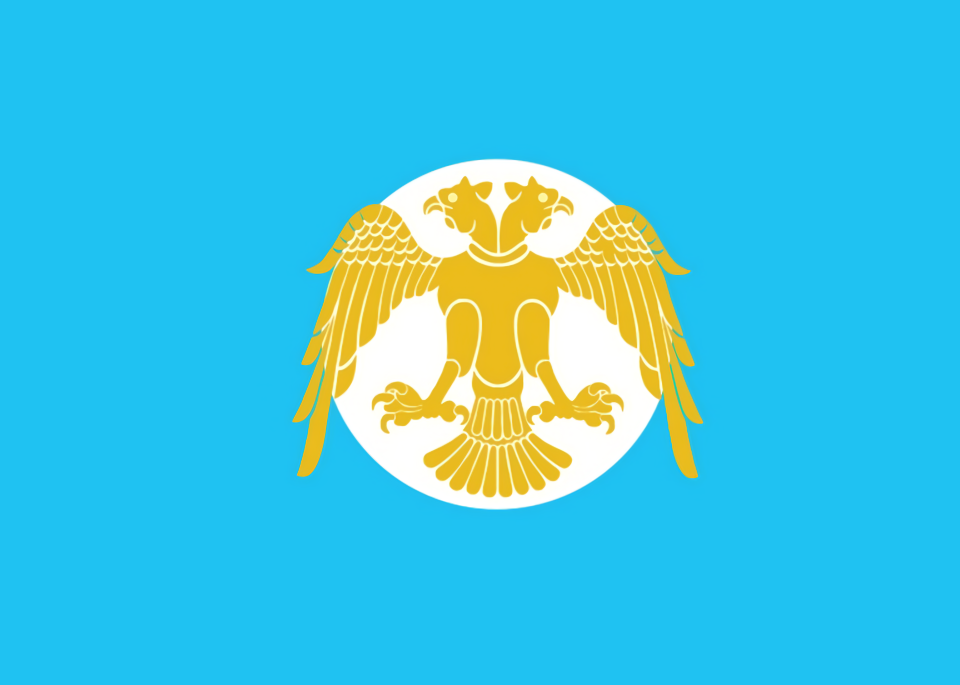
- Official flag of Syrian Turkmen as declared by the official governing body of Turkmen in Syria, the Syrian Turkmen Assembly on 25 November 2015.
- Leaders: Ahmet Arnavut (overall commander); Lt. Tarık Solak (2nd Coastal Division-2nd brigade commander); Riyad Qarrah Bijeq (DOW) (2nd Coastal Division commander); Alparslan Çelik (Turkmen Mountain Brigade commander); Ömer Abdullah (Field commander); Adil Orli (Field commander); Col. Ahmed Othman (Sultan Murad Division commander); Fahim Issa (Sultan Murad Division commander); Ali Şeyh Salih (DOW) (Sultan Murad Division commander)
- Dates active: 2012–2025
- Allegiance: Syrian Turkmen Assembly: Syrian Turkmen National Bloc; Syrian Democratic Turkmen Movement
- Groups: Sultan Murad Division; Sultan Suleiman Shah Division; Muntasir Billah Brigade; Sultan Mehmed the Conqueror Brigade; Samarkand Brigade (formerly part of the Hamza Division); 2nd Coastal Division; Alparslan Special Forces; Syrian Turkmen Front; Suleyman Shah Union; Sultan Selim Brigade; Anwar al-Haq Battalion; Ashab al-Yamin Brigade; Sultan Malik-Shah Brigade; Seljuk Brigade (left to join the Syrian Democratic Forces in 2015)
- Active regions: Aleppo Governorate; Latakia Governorate
- Ideology: Turkish nationalism; Neo-Ottomanism; Pan-Turkism
- Size: 5,000 (2015)
- Part of: Free Syrian Army; Syrian National Army
- Wars: Syrian Civil War; Siege of Homs; 2012 Homs offensive; Rojava conflict; Rojava–Islamist conflict; Battle of Aleppo (2012–2016); Battle of al-Haffah; Campaign for Turkmen Mountain, Bayırbucak, Salib al-Turkman towards Latakia; 2014 Latakia offensive; 2015–16 Latakia offensive; 2015 Russian Sukhoi Su-24 shootdown; 2016 Latakia offensive; Operation Euphrates Shield; Battle of al-Rai (August 2016); Northern al-Bab offensive (September 2016); Northwestern Syria offensive (2024); Battle of Aleppo (2024)

Syrian Turkmen Brigades (Turkish: Suriye Türkmen Tugayları; Arabic: كتائب تركمان سوريا), also called the United Turkmen Army (Turkish: Birleşik Türkmen Ordusu; Arabic: الجيش التركماني الموحد), were an informal armed opposition structure composed of Syrian Turkmen that form the military wing of the Syrian Turkmen Assembly, primarily fighting against the Syrian Arab Armed Forces and the Syrian Democratic Forces. They were aligned with the Syrian opposition and were heavily supported by Turkey, which provides funding and military training along with artillery and aerial support. The groups represent a wide spectrum of ideologies from Islamism to secular Turkish nationalism.

== History ==
In November 2015, Syrian Turkmen Brigades and Al-Nusra Front fighters were engaged in heavy fighting in the Bayırbucak region against the Syrian government forces supported by the Hezbollah militia and the Russian Air Force. Turkmen forces have been the target of heavy Russian bombing in 2015, with reported civilian casualties which have been interpreted as a Russian effort aiming to change the ethnic dynamics of the region.

On 24 November 2015, a Russian Su-24 fighter was shot down by Turkish forces for allegedly violating Turkish airspace, near the Syrian border. The aircraft crashed on Syrian land. The two pilots ejected and were shot at in the air while using their parachutes by the Syrian Turkmen Brigades.

== Military structure and groups ==
=== Aleppo ===
The Sultan Murad Division was formed in early 2013 and mainly operates in the Aleppo Governorate. Its groups includes: Mehmed the Conqueror Brigade, Sultan Murad Brigade, Martyr Zaki Turkmani Brigade, Ashbal Akida Brigade, Hamza and Abbas Brigade, Ahli Sunnah and Community Brigade, Yarmouk Regiment, 1st Regiment and the Turkmen Martyrs Brigade. Another predominantly Turkmen rebel militia in Aleppo Governorate is the Muntasir Billah Brigade.

=== Latakia ===
Formed in July 2015, the 2nd Coastal Division is the main Turkmen rebel group operating in the Latakia Governorate and is notable for killing one Russian Air Force pilot, who ejected from a Su-24 which was shot down by Turkey. The commander of the group, Alparslan Çelik, is a member of the Grey Wolves. The subdivisions are the Brigade of Mountain Turkmen, the Sultan Mehmet the Conqueror Brigade, the Sultan Selim Brigade, and the 1071 Raiders Brigade The 2nd Coastal Division has less than 500 fighters as of the end of 2015, although the group claims to have 2,000.

According to the Syrian Turkmen National Movement Party, as of early 2016, three out of more than 40 villages in the Turkmen Mountain of Latakia were left under Turkmen rebel control, as the result of the rebel defeat in the 2015–16 Latakia offensive. Many Turkmen rebels in the area are Turkish citizens affiliated with the Grey Wolves. The 2nd Coastal Division took part in the 2016 Latakia offensive in an attempt to regain the territory lost to government forces in 2015. Over the course of the offensive, rebels retook Kinsabba, though division commander Riyad Qarrah Bijeq was mortally wounded during the assault.

=== Aligned with SDF ===
The Seljuq Brigade (former Sultan Selim Brigade member, now Army of Revolutionaries member) and the Manbij Turkmen Battalion (Army of Revolutionaries's Northern Sun Battalion) are Syrian Turkmen groups operating Rojava Syria respectively, unlike other Syrian Turkmen rebel groups, they are allied with the Syrian Democratic Forces and are not supported by Turkey.

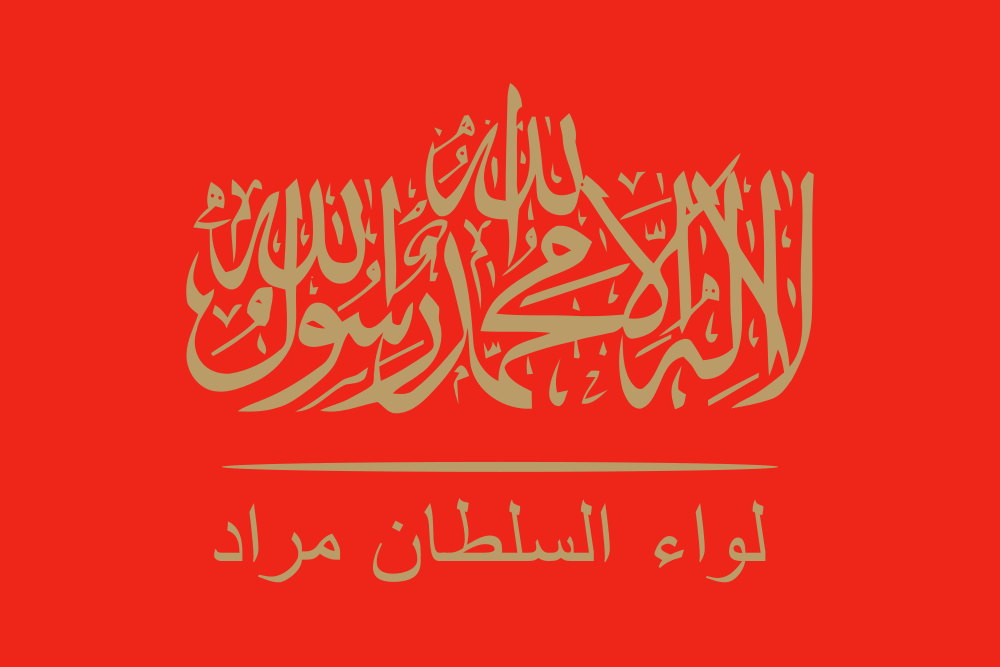
Other flags used by Syrian Turkmen fighters and brigades on the battlefield and at various places

== See also ==
- List of armed groups in the Syrian Civil War
- Syrian Turkmen
