= Al-Ghazzi =

Al-Ghazzi (Arabic: الغزي) is a prominent family based in Damascus. It was best known for producing noted ulema and other scholars and the leadership of the Shafi'i madhhab (school of jurisprudence) in Damascus during late Mamluk (1260–1517) and Ottoman rule (1517–1918). Toward the end of Ottoman rule, throughout French rule (1920–1946) and following Syria's independence in 1946 several members of the family held political office, including at the national level, and as prominent professionals and journalists.

== Origins ==
The Ghazzi family historically claimed descent from the Banu Amir ibn Lu'ayy clan of the Quraysh tribe of the Islamic prophet Muhammad, hence their frequent use of the nisba al-Amiri al-Qurashi. The family moved from Gaza, hence the family's name al-Ghazzi (lit. 'from Gaza') to Damascus in 1348 under its head al-Shihab Ahmad ibn Abdullah ibn Badr. Ahmad became a prominent member of the city's Shafi'i ulema as well as an instructor in a number of madrasas (schools) and administrator of several waqfs (endowments).

== Leaders of the Shafi'is of Damascus ==
The descendants of Ahmad followed him in the engagement of Islamic scholarship. His grandson Radi al-Din Muhammad (1458–1529) was the deputy qadi (judge) of the Shafi'is and an important figure in the Sufi Qadiriyya order in the late 15th and early 16th century, during the ending years of Mamluk rule and the beginnings of Ottoman rule. (Note: Radi al-Din's full name was Rāḍī al-Dīn Abū al-Faḍl Muḥammad ibn Rāḍī al-Dīn Abū al-Barakāt Muḥammad ibn Aḥmad ibn ʿAbd Allāh ibn Badr al-Ghazzī al-Dimashqī al-ʿĀmirī al-Qurashī al-Shāfiʿī.) He had lost his position at some point before or during the political transition, but regained it by developing close ties with the Ottoman government. He penned works about Sufism, aqida (creed), agriculture and plants, medicine, and Arabic grammar.

Radi al-Din's son Badr al-Din, born in 1499, received an elite education in the Mamluk capital Cairo, including instruction by al-Suyuti. He started his career as a scholar in Damascus around 1515. He eventually became the Shafi'i mufti of Damascus and an instructor in the Umayyad Mosque. He wrote one of the first Arabic travel accounts of Constantinople, the Ottoman capital, and the places along the way, called al-Matali al-badriyya fi al-manazil al-Rumiyya (Full Moon Rising: Waystations to Constantinople) during his visit in 1530–1531. By the time of his death in 1577 he had become among the preeminent scholars of Damascus, best known for his tafsirs (interpretations of Islamic scripture) and his fatwas (legal opinions).

Badr al-Din's son Najm al-Din penned a substantial dictionary of biographies of Syrian, as well as Egyptian and other Ottoman, notables of the 16th and 17th centuries. His grandnephew Shams al-Din (d. 1754), the Shafi'i mufti, also penned an extensive collection of biographies, though much broader in scope. Some fourteen members of the family are mentioned among the leading ulema of Damascus by the local 18th-century historian Khalil al-Muradi.

== Notable members ==
- Najm al-Din al-Ghazzi (d. 1651, Ottoman-era scholar of Damascus)
- Fawzi al-Ghazzi
- Nadia al-Ghazzi
- Said al-Ghazzi

== Bibliography ==
- Abu Hussein, Tarek Abdul Rahim (June 2010). Historians and Historical Thought in an Ottoman World: Biographical Writing in 16th and 17th Century Syria/Bilad al-Sham (PDF) (MA). Sabancı University.
- Pfeifer, Helen (2022). Empire of Salons: Conquest and Community in Early Modern Ottoman Lands. Princeton: Princeton University Press. ISBN 9780691195230.
- Schilcher, Linda Schatowski (1985). Families in Politics: Damascene Factions and Estates of the 18th and 19th Centuries. Franz Steiner. ISBN 3-515-03146-4.
- Taji-Farouki, Suha (2006). ʿIbn Arabī: A Prayer for Spiritual Elevation and Protection. Oxford: Anqa Publishing. ISBN 0-9534513-0-5.
