= Syrian Turkmen Movement =

Syrian Turkmen Movement Suriye Türkmen Hareketi
- Leader: Ali Öztürkmen
- Founded: 2011
- Dissolved: 15 February 2012
- Merged into: Syria Turkmen Bloc
- Headquarters: Turkey
- Ideology: Syrian Turkmens' interests Turkish nationalism
- National affiliation: Syrian National Council

The Syrian Turkmen Movement (Turkish: Suriye Türkmen Hareketi) was the first Syrian opposition movement of Syrian Turkmens. Founded by Ali Öztürkmen, who left Syria for Turkey soon after the Syrian uprising in 2011, it strived to politicize Syrian Turkmens to take to the streets as "Turkmen". In February 2012, it joined forces with the newly founded Syrian Turkmen Group to form the larger Syria Turkmen Bloc.

Mainly based on social networking, the movement also attended the Conference for Change in Syria held on 1 June 2011 in Antalya, Turkey, and all of the Istanbul conferences of the Syrian Opposition, striving to have the Turkmen minority explicitly mentioned in all reports.

In November 2011, the Movement joined forces with the newly formed Syrian Turkmen Group to launch a broader political party, the Syria Turkmen Bloc, which was officially established in February 2012. Inmidst the merger phase, they however suffered a split, with both leaders of the constituent organizations, the Movement's Ali Öztürkmen and the Syrian Turkmen Group's Bekir Atacan, leaving to launch yet another activism-based movement, the Syrian Democratic Turkmen Movement.
