= Syrian Turkmen Group =

Syrian Turkmen Group Suriye Türkmenler Birliği
- Leader: Bekir Atacan
- Founded: 2011
- Dissolved: 15 February 2012
- Merged into: Syria Turkmen Bloc
- Headquarters: Turkey
- Ideology: Syrian Turkmens' interests Turkish nationalism
- National affiliation: Syrian National Council

The Syrian Turkmen Group (Turkish: Suriye Türkmenler Birliği) was an early Syrian opposition movement of Syrian Turkmens. Founded in 2011 by prominent Syrian Turkmens and 180 Syrian Turkmen in Turkey, it was led by Bekir Atacan. In late 2011, it joined forces with the preexisting Syrian Turkmen Movement to form the larger Syria Turkmen Bloc, which was officially established in February 2012.

Amidst the merger phase, they however suffered a split, with both leaders of the constituent organizations, the Group's Bekir Atacan and the Syrian Turkmen Movement's Ali Öztürkmen, leaving to launch yet another activism-based movement, the Syrian Democratic Turkmen Movement.
