= Adil Şan =

Syrian and Turkish singer and poet (born 1980)

- Born: Adel Alıssa; September 12, 1980; Al-Rabia Sub-district, Latakia, Syria
- Occupation: Singer

Adil Şan (born September 12, 1980) is a Syrian and Turkish singer and poet. He represented Syria in the Turkvision Song Contest 2015 in Istanbul, Turkey, with the song "Geliş", where he was placed 5th with 165 points. Şan's song has since gained popularity after being used in the Turkish soap opera "Diriliş: Ertuğrul".

== Early life and career ==
Şan was born "Adel Alıssa" in the Turkmen Mountains in Syria. His father is a Syrian Turkmen from the countryside of Aleppo and his mother is of Turkish origin from Gaziantep. He did not attend school, however, he was self-taught in the Turkish language.

In 2003 he launched his first Turkish folk album entitled "Çobanbey Elleri". Soon after establishing his music career, he moved to Turkey and married his wife on September 12, 2006. He obtained Turkish citizenship and changed his surname to "Şan". By 2013 he launched his second album "Hattuç". He was Syria's first representative in the Turkvision Song Contest in Istanbul, Turkey, in 2015. In the same year he also published a book on Syrian Turkmen culture. His third album "Dilimiz" was launched in 2016.

== Personal life ==
He is married and has one son named Oğuzhan.
