= Turkmen Mountain =

Mountain in Syria

- جبل تركمان
- Location within Syria

Highest point
- Coordinates: 35°46′53″N 35°58′57″E

Geography
- Location: Latakia, Syria

Turkmen Mountain (Arabic: جبل تركمان; Jabal Turkman, Turkish: Türkmen Dağı) is a mountain range in the north of the Latakia region of Syria, in the area called Bayırbucak locally in Turkish, neighboring the Turkish border. The name is not historically attested in written sources, and came into use in the media around 2012.

The mountain range runs along the eastern length of Latakia Governorate. The area is mostly inhabited by Syrian Turkmen people and has seen military activity by the Syrian Army and Russian air strikes in late 2015. Close to 300,000 Turkmens have been displaced since the start of the Syrian Civil War, especially in The Turkmens mountains, where the Syrian Government enacted a demographic change by forcing the last remaining Turkmen families to leave to Turkey, and settled Alawite families in the areas controlled by government forces.

Two Turkish F-16s shot down one of two Russian Su-24 fighter jets in Syria on 24 November 2015. Both pilots ejected safely, however one pilot was captured on the ground and killed by Turkmen forces under the command of Alparslan Çelik.
