= Seljuk Brigade =

Turkmen militia in the 2011–2024 Syrian civil war

- Turkish: Selçuklular Tugayı; Arabic: لواء السلاجقة
- Leaders: Col. Talal Ali Silo; Hani al-Mullah †
- Dates active: 2013 – unknown
- Group: Hammam Turkmen Martyrs Brigade
- Headquarters: Al-Rai, Syria (formerly)
- Active regions: Aleppo Governorate; Raqqa Governorate; Hasakah Governorate
- Part of: (Syrian opposition) Free Syrian Army; Syrian Turkmen Brigades (2013–2015); Syrian Democratic Forces; Al-Bab Military Council; Army of Revolutionaries (2015–present)
- Wars: the Syrian Civil War

The Seljuk Brigade (Turkish: Selçuklular Tugayı, Arabic: لواء السلاجقة) is a Syrian Turkmen rebel group participating in the Syrian civil war, named after the Seljuk Turks.

== History ==
The Seljuk Brigade was founded in early 2013 in the northern Aleppo Governorate by Colonel Talal Ali Silo and was temporary a part of the Suleyman Shah Brigade.

It was initially based in the Turkmen village of al-Rai, before its capture by the Islamic State of Iraq and the Levant (ISIL) in January 2014. As with the other Syrian Turkmen Brigades, the group was supplied and armed by Turkey, although tensions occurred between them after the capture of al-Rai due to Turkey favouring the Fatih Sultan Mehmed Brigade in Jarabulus, sending only a limited amount of arms to the Seljuk Brigade.

It then joined the Army of Revolutionaries in August 2015, which became part of the Syrian Democratic Forces in October 2015. The group's commander, Talal Silo, was present at the SDF formation announcement; furthermore, he announced the SDF's 2015 Al-Hawl offensive. In November 2017, Silo defected to Turkey.

Unlike other Turkmen rebel groups, they were allied with the Kurdish YPG. The Seljuk Brigade in Manbij condemned the Turkish military intervention in Syria in late August 2016.

On 10 September 2016 one of the brigade's commanders, Hani al-Mullah, died of a gunshot to the head in the town of Tell Abyad. The Syrian Citizen journalism organisation Raqqa Is Being Slaughtered Silently claimed that his death was the result of suicide, although other sources dispute this and allege that the killing was an assassination, either by the Turkish National Intelligence Organization and Turkish rebels or by ISIL militants. As a result, a curfew was imposed in Tell Abyad.
