= Syria Turkmen Bloc =

Syrian Turkmen Bloc Suriye Türkmen Kitlesi
- Arabic name: الكتلة الوطنية التركمانية السورية
- Leader: Yusuf Mulla
- Founded: 15 February 2012
- Preceded by: Syrian Turkmen Group, Syrian Turkmen Movement
- Headquarters: Turkey
- Military wing: Syrian Turkmen Brigades (controlling the forces of Latakia and the western front)
- Ideology: Syrian Turkmens' interests Turkish nationalism Pro-Europeanism
- National affiliation: Syrian Turkmen Assembly, Syrian National Council, Syrian National Coalition

The Syria Turkmen Bloc (Turkish: Suriye Türkmen Kitlesi) or Syrian Turkmen National Bloc (Arabic: الكتلة الوطنية التركمانية السورية) is one of the two major opposition movements of Syrian Turkmens. The party is headed by Yusuf Mulla.

The party was founded in Istanbul in February 2012. Still in the foundation phase, it suffered an early split, leading to the emergence of the Syrian Democratic Turkmen Movement. A reconciliatory meeting in December 2012 laid the grounds to the formation of the Syrian Turkmen Assembly. Since then, the Syrian Turkmen Bloc focused on its remaining strongholds in Latakia and Bayır-Bucak, while the Syrian Democratic Turkmen Movement focuses on Aleppo.

The founding conference was supported by Mazlum-Der, a foundation linked to the Turkish AKP. After its foundation, the party joined the National Change Current (a coalition of smaller opposition parties). The representatives of the Syria Turkmen Bloc participated in the meetings for the Syrian Turkmen Assembly.

The Syria Turkmen Bloc is also associated with the Turkmen troops of Nurettin Zengi, Zahir Baybars, Al Huva Billa, Yavuz Sultan Selim, Sultan Mehmet the Conqueror, Memduh Colha, Bin Tamime, Katip Al Mustafa, Firsan Tevhid, Sukur ul Turkmen (Turkmen Falcons), which are all under the control of Brigade of Turkmen Mountain led by Muhammad Awad in the Latakia province.
