= Syrian Democratic Turkmen Movement =

Syrian Democratic Turkmen Movement Suriye Demokratik Türkmen Hareketi
- Arabic name: الحركة التركمانية الديمقراطية
- Leader: Ziyad Hasan
- Founder: Bekir Atacan, Ali Öztürkmen, Abdulkerim Ağa
- Founded: 21 March 2012
- Split from: Syria Turkmen Bloc
- Headquarters: Turkey
- Youth wing: Youth Branch of Turkmens
- Military wing: Syrian Turkmen Brigades (controlling the forces of Aleppo and the eastern front)
- Ideology: Syrian Turkmens' interests Turkish nationalism Pan-Turkism; Pan-Turanism; Pro-Europeanism
- National affiliation: Syrian Turkmen Assembly, Syrian National Council, Syrian National Coalition

The Syrian Democratic Turkmen Movement (Turkish: Suriye Demokratik Türkmen Hareketi; Arabic: الحركة التركمانية الديمقراطية) is one of the two major opposition movements of Syrian Turkmens. Headquartered in Istanbul, it emerged in March 2012 from a split inmidst the foundation phase of the Syria Turkmen Bloc, which is the other major Syrian Turkmen movement.

Since another regrouping in December 2012 drove many of its more prominent members back to the Syria Turkmen Bloc, the Syrian Democratic Turkmen Movement now focusses on its stronghold in Aleppo province, where it is considered to have some leverage within the Turkmen parts of civil society. It however cooperates with the Latakia and Bayır-Bucak-focussed Bloc in the Syrian Turkmen Assembly.

The Movement is a member of the Syrian National Council and is represented in the Syrian National Coalition. Militarily, it is allied with Ali Basher's Aleppo branch of the Syrian Turkmen Brigades.

== History ==
In November 2011, Bekir Atacan's Syrian Turkmen Group, an organization of prominent and exile Syrian Turkmen, and Ali Öztürkmen's more street- and networking-affine Syrian Turkmen Movement had joined forces to form the Syria Turkmen Bloc. Atacan and Öztürkmen were already appointed the first chairman resp. deputy chairman. Prior to the Blocs official establishment on 15 February 2012, the two leaders however left, with Atacan citing his failed efforts to further enlarge the Bloc as the reason. Joining forces with young Syrian Turkmens living in Turkey, they launched another formation, the Syrian Democratic Turkmen Movement.

The new Movement was founded on 21 March 2012 in Istanbul, under the auspices of representatives of Turkey's Islamist Great Unity Party (BBP), the Iraqi Turkmen Front and of Ülkü Ocakları, the "Grey Wolves" youth branch of the Nationalist Movement Party (MHP). The new movement's first leader Abdulkerim Ağa stressed their determination to "take an active role in Syrian politics," while reaching out to "all the various actors of the Syrian opposition to achieve a democratic and civilized Syria".

The first meeting of the reconciliatory Syrian Turkmen Platform (now: Syrian Turkmen Assembly) on 15 December 2012 led to another regrouping, with some of the Movement's more prominent figures leaving, again including Atacan, to give the idea of a wide political party on behalf of the Syrian Turkmens yet another try. While they eventually reconciled with the Syria Turkmen Bloc, the Movement decided to carry on, refocussing on its stronghold in Aleppo, and appointing Ziyad Hasan and Tarık Sulo Cevizci the new chairman and deputy chairman. The Syria Turkmen Bloc on the other hand focusses on its strongholds in Latakia and Bayır-Bucak.

== Positions ==
The Syrian Democratic Turkmen Movement asserts that there are 3.5 million Turkmens in Syria. However, the party is against a divided Syria because Syrian Turkmens live scattered in various cities such as Aleppo, Homs, Latakia, Azaz, Jarablus, Raqqah, Idlib, Hama and Damascus, and a divided Syria would do serious damage to the interests of the Turkmens.

In an interview with Turkish think-tank ORSAM, the later chairman Ziyad Hasan in February 2012 stated the main political expectations of the Turkmens he represents as following:

- a constitutional drafting process with Turkmen's participation
- the transition to a multi-party system
- the recognition of Turkmen as a primary component of Syria
- establishment of the Turkish language as an official language in areas with a strong Turkmen minority
- Turkish language courses in public schools and removal of legal barriers against native language education
- reinforcement of local governments' authority
- a sustainable economic development process to improve economic conditions of all Syrian people

Hasan deplored the relative calm in Aleppo compared to other regions of the country, explaining it with insecurity due to the presence of various ethnic and religious groups, and the metropolitan lifestyle of the city. While he said the vast majority of Turkmens in Aleppo supported the uprising, Assyrians and Armenians feared an emerging Islamic regime. He considered the Kurds as a major power in the region, and as heavily influenced by the PKK, which – in line with the Turkish government's position – he brands a "terrorist organization".

== Activities ==
=== Diplomatic efforts ===
The Movement is represented in the Syrian Turkmen Assembly, which it initiated as a supra-political-parties structure to alleviate the split within the Syrian Turkmen community. Stressing the diplomatic efforts with Turkey and the Syrian opposition, delegating 16 representatives to the Syrian National Council and 3 Turkmen representatives to the Syrian National Coalition.

=== Political and military activism ===
On the ground, the Movement was said to carry out almost all [Turkmen] political, civilian and military activities in Aleppo. It is associated with Ali Basher, who commands the Syrian Turkmen Brigades in the province of Aleppo such as Sultan Mehmet the Conqueror, Zahir Baybars Brigade, Martyr Ali Yılmaz Troop, Suleiman Shah Troop, Alparslan Troop, Yıldırım Beyazıt Brigade, and Sultan Abdul Hamid Troops.
