= Syrian Turkmen =

Ethnic group

Syria Turkmens Suriye Türkmenleri

Regions with significant populations
- Bayirbujak and other areas of settlement

Languages
- Turkish; Arabic

Religion
- Primarily: Sunni Islam

Related ethnic groups
- Turkish people; Iraqi Turkmen; Turks in Jordan; Palestinian Turkmen; Turks in Egypt; Lebanese Turkmen; Israeli Turkmen; Turks in the Balkans; Azerbaijanis

Syria Turkmens, also referred to as Syria Turks (Arabic: تركمان سوريا, romanized: Turkumān Sūriyā; Turkish: Suriye Türkmenleri) (Note: Also referred to as Syrian Turkomans, Turkish Syrians, or simply Syrian Turks or Turks of Syria (Suriye Türkleri).) are Syrian citizens of Turkish race who mainly trace their roots to Anatolia (i.e. modern Turkey). Turkish-speaking Syrian Turkmen make up one of the country's minority groups.

The majority of Syrian Turkmen are the descendants of migrants who arrived in Syria during Ottoman rule (1516–1918); however, there are also many Syrian Turkmen who are the descendants of earlier Turkish settlers that arrived during the Seljuk (1037–1194) and Mamluk (1250–1517) periods. The majority of Syrian Turkmen are Sunni Muslims.

Syrian Turkmen share common genealogical and linguistic ties with the Turkish people in Turkey and Iraqi Turkmen, but do not identify themselves with the Turkmen of Turkmenistan and Central Asia. Most live near the Syrian-Turkish border, in an area that runs from the northwestern governorates of Idlib and Aleppo to the Raqqa Governorate. Others reside in the Turkmen Mountain near Latakia, the city of Homs and its vicinity until Hama, Damascus, and the southwestern governorates of Daraa (bordering Jordan) and Quneitra (bordering Israel).

During the Syrian Civil War, many Syrian Turkmen were involved in military action against the Assad regime until its fall in December 2024. Additionally, they have been fighting against the Syrian Democratic Forces (SDF), and have looked to the Turkish Armed Forces for support and protection. Many united under an official governing body, the Syrian Turkmen Assembly, and established the military wing of the assembly, the Syrian Turkmen Brigades. However, not all Turkmen support the Turkish occupation of northern Syria, and some have sided with the SDF, forming the Seljuk Brigade.

== History ==
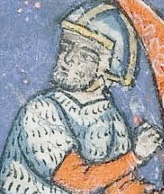
The Zengid ruler Nur al-Din unified Syria after he took Damascus in 1154.

Turkic migration to Syria began in the 11th century during the rule of the Seljuk Empire. However, most Turkmen settled in the region after the Ottoman sultan Selim I conquered Syria in 1516. The Ottoman administration encouraged Turcoman families from Anatolia to establish villages throughout the rural hinterlands of several cities in Ottoman Syria (and later the Syria Vilayet). Migration from Anatolia to Syria was continuous for over 400 years of Ottoman rule, until the dissolution of the Ottoman Empire in 1918; nonetheless, Syrian Turkmen community continued to reside in the region during the French Mandate and the formation of Syrian Republics.

=== Seljuk era ===
Syrian Turkmen have had a presence in Syria since the 11th century. The first recorded entry of free Turkmen troops into Syria was in 1064 when the Turkmen prince Ibn Khan and 1,000 of his archers entered Aleppo. He came at the request of the Arab Mirdasid emir Atiyya ibn Salih to assist him against his own Banu Kilab tribesmen who backed a rival Mirdasid emir, Mahmud ibn Nasr. Turkmen rule in the region began with the Seljuk conquests in the Middle East. The Seljuk Turks opened the way for mass migration of Turkish nomads once they entered northern Syria in 1071, and took Damascus in 1078 and Aleppo in 1086. By the 12tn century the Turkic Zengid dynasty (a vassal of the Seljuk Empire) continued to settle Turkmen in the wilayah of Aleppo to confront attacks from the Crusaders. In return for their military service, the Turkic rulers distributed fiefs in the area to the Turkmen.

=== Mamluk era ===
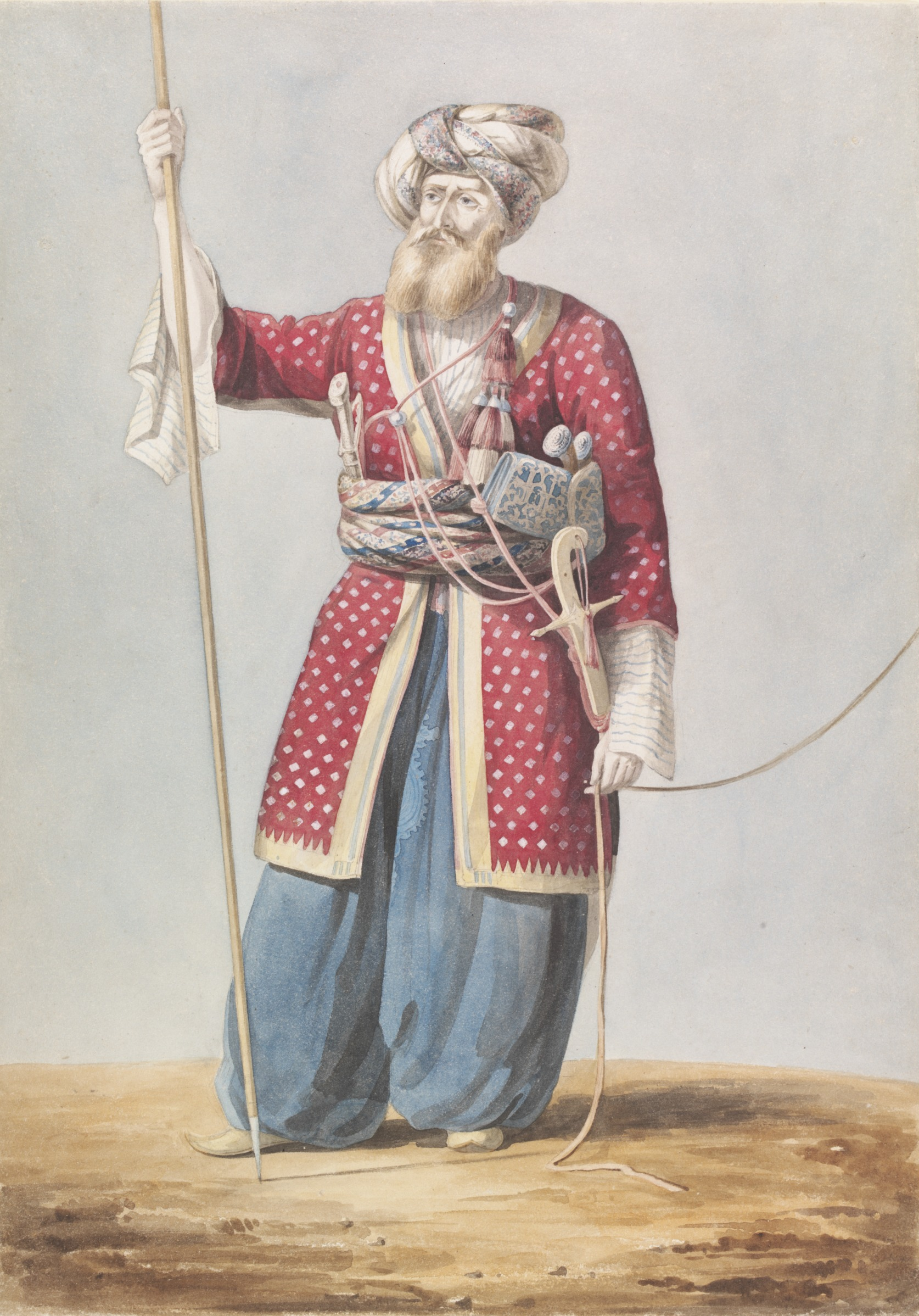
A Mamluk from Aleppo.

In 1260, the Mamluk Sultanate – ruled by a line of Turkish and Circassian sultans – entered Syria in response to the Mongol invasions. Whilst Cairo remained the seat of the Mamluk Sultanate, Damascus became their second capital. Hence, by the thirteenth century, the Turkmen formed a part of the armies of Damascus and Aleppo, and permanently settled in these regions. After the Bahri sultan of the Mamluks, Baibars, destroyed Qara he settled Turkmen in the town in 1265. Two years later, he settled more Turkmen in the Syrian coast to protect the region. The Turkmen were called on to assist in the capture of Margat by the Muslim commander of the Krak des Chevaliers in 1280. The late Mamluk-era writer Ahmad al-Qalqashandi noted that Turkmen formed contingents in the regular armies of greater Syria. By the 15th century, the Muslim writer Khalil az-Zahiri recorded 180,000 Turkmen soldiers and 20,000 Kurdish soldiers in Syria. The Turkmen mainly lived in the provinces of Aleppo and were settled in suburbs such as al-Hadir al-Sulaymani; they also live near the coast and the Jawlan (i.e. Golan Heights).

The Mamluk rule in Syria evidently led to the "Turkmanization" of the northern regions. According to one eye-witness during the reign of Qaitbay, Abu al-Baqa ibn al-Ji'an, the dominant language from Latakia to Birecik was Turkish.

=== Ottoman era ===
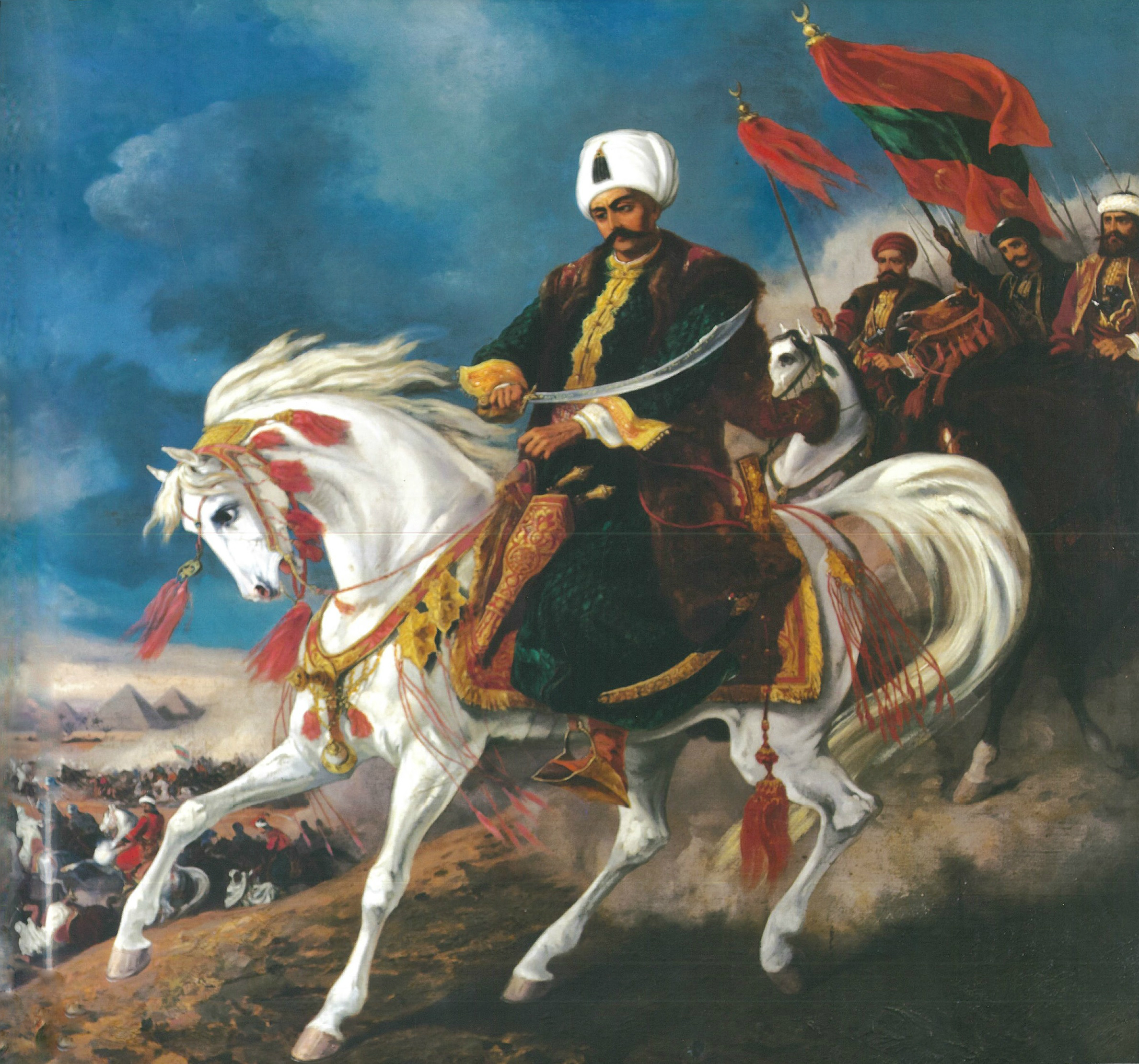
Syria came under Ottoman rule once Selim I conquered the Mamluk Sultanate of Egypt in 1516–17.

Mamluk rule of Syria ended once the Ottoman Sultan Selim I conquered the region in 1516–17. Thereafter, the Ottoman administration encouraged Turkish nomads from Anatolia to settle in strategic areas of the region. By the sixteenth century the Ottomans continued to settle Turkmen in the rural areas around Homs and Hama to keep the Bedouin in check and serve as mütesellim.

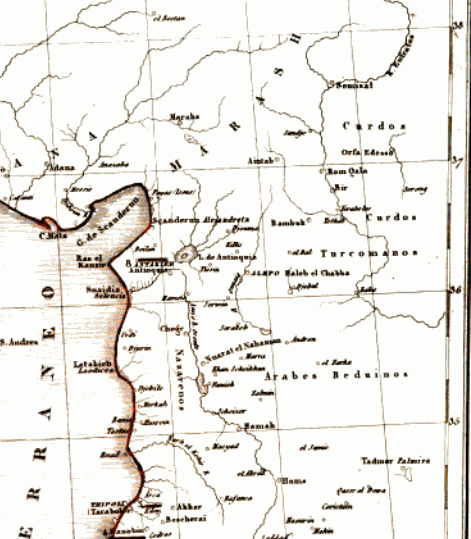
Turkmens (Turcomanos) shown inhabiting the western side of the Euphrates, in modern-day northwestern Syria, in Atlas histórico de Tierra Santa (1840)

Turkish migration from Anatolia to Ottoman Syria was continuous for almost 400 years, until Ottoman rule ended in 1918. The Turkish settlement throughout the rural hinterlands of several Syrian cities was a state-organized population transfer which was used to counter the demographic weight and influence of other ethnic groups in the region. Furthermore, the Turkmen served as the local gendarmes to help assert Ottoman authority.

By the late nineteenth century, many Turkish refugees who lost their lands to Russia in the European regions of the Ottoman Empire (particularly in the Balkans) settled in Ottoman Syria between 1878 and 1906 and were provided with new lands by the Ottoman state. According to Dawn Chatty, these Turkmen settlers (alongside Circassian and Chechen refugees) became loyal subjects to the sultan and were "driven to succeed in agriculture and ready to defend themselves against any Bedouin claims to the land on which they had built their villages".

==== Vilayet of Aleppo ====
According to the French geographer Vital Cuinet (1833–96), the Ottoman Turks (excluding Turkmen nomads) formed the second largest ethnic group, after the Syrian Arabs, in the Aleppo Sanjak. In his best known work La Turquie d'Asie, géographie administrative: statistique, descriptive et raisonnée de chaque province de l'Asie Mineure he stated that the demographic structure of the Sanjak was as follows:

Ethnic and religious groups	Estimated population in the Aleppo Sanjak (ca.1890-95)	Percentage
Syrian Arab	300,541	38.41%
Ottoman Turk	159,787	20.43%
Kurdish and Turkmen nomads	103,744	13.26%
Greek Catholic	23,315	2.98%
Syrian Catholic	20,913	2.67%
Syrian Jacobite	20,594	2.63%
Jew	19,633	2.51%
Greek Orthodox	18,665	2.39%
Armenian Apostolic	17,999	2.30%
Chaldean Catholic	17,027	2.18%
Armenian Catholic	15,563	1.96%
Chaldean non-Uniate	15,300	1.96%
Protestant	9,033	1.15%
Circassian	9,000	1.15%
Other Muslims (Fellah, Ansarieh, Tahtaji, Nusairi)	26,713	3.41%
Other Catholic (Latin and Maronite)	4,447	0.57%
Total	782,274	100%

=== French Mandate ===
==== The Alexandretta/Hatay Question ====
In 1938 the Hatay State was formed in the Sanjak of Alexandretta of the French Mandate of Syria. It was annexed by Turkey in 1939 and became the Hatay Province.

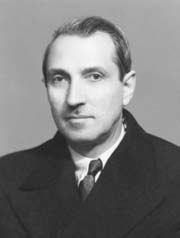
Tayfur Sökmen was the President of the Hatay State.

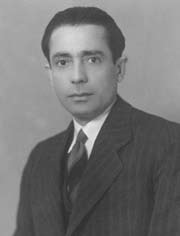
Abdurrahman Melek was the Prime Minister of the Hatay State.

In 1921, the Treaty of Ankara established Alexandretta (present-day Hatay) under an autonomous regime under French Mandate of Syria. The Turks were initially satisfied with this agreement, because Article 7 declared that "The Turkish inhabitants of this district shall enjoy every facility for their cultural development. The Turkish language shall have official recognition." Moreover, Article 9 stated that the tomb of Suleyman Shah, grandfather of the first Ottoman ruler Osman I, "shall remain, with its appurtenances, the property of Turkey."

Population of Hatay State in 1936 according to the French census
Ethnic group	Inhabitants	%
Turks	85,800	39%
Alawites	61,600	28%
Armenians	24,200	11%
Sunni Arabs	22,000	10%
other Christians	17,600	8%
Circassians, Jews, Kurds	8,800	4%
Total	220,000	100%

In September 1936, France announced that it would grant full independence to Syria, which would also include Alexandretta. The President of the Republic of Turkey, Mustafa Kemal Atatürk, responded with a demand that Alexandretta be given its own independence. The issue was brought before the League of Nations, which sent a mission to the district in January 1937. The mission concluded that the Turks constituted a majority and by July 1938 elections were held in the province; the Turks formed a majority of 22 seats in a 40-seat parliament of the newly established Hatay State, which remained a joint Franco-Turkish protectorate. The Hatay State began using Turkish flags, and petitioned Ankara to unify Hatay to the Republic of Turkey. France finally agreed to the Turkish annexation on 23 July 1939. Today, the Bayırbucak region, the coastal and rural section covering the northern Latakia area, has a considerable Turkmen presence and is considered by some Turks as a "stretch of the modern Turkish Hatay Province".

=== Syrian Republican era ===
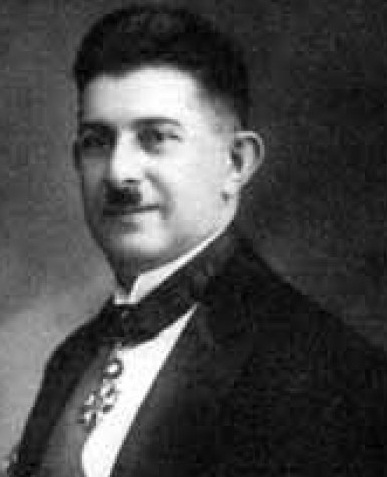
Subhi Barakat, of Turkish origin, was the first President of Syria.

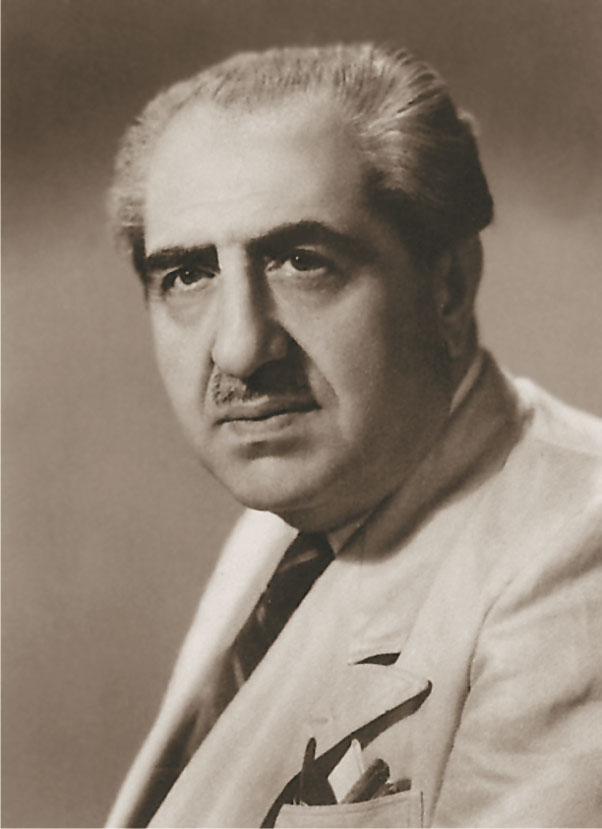
Of Turkish origin, Khalil Mardam Bey was the composer of the Syrian National Anthem.

Traditional flag of Syrian Turkmen

After the Sanjak of Alexandretta became the province of Hatay in the Republic of Turkey, in 1939, some Turkish families immigrated into the new borders of Syria, settling in the provinces of Aleppo and Damascus. Hence, new "Turkish streets" began to emerge, such as in the al-Salihia district in Damascus. Family unifications of Turkmen families living on both sides of the Syrian-Turkish border continued for more than 70 years until the outbreak of the Syrian revolution.

By 1950, Latakia showed great economic potential as the largest port city in Syria, and many Syrian Turkmen living in rural villages joined the Turkmen community already established there. Consequently, there is now a total of 265 Turkish villages in and around Latakia center.

In addition to urban migrations, under the name of "land reform", lands owned by the Turkmen were nationalized and Arabs were resettled in areas near the Turkish border. Arabization policies also saw the names of Turkish villages renamed with Arabic names. Thus, a mass exodus of Syrian Turkmen migration to Turkey took place between 1945 and 1953, many of which settled in Kirikhan, Alexandretta and Adana, in southern Turkey.

The cultural and political rights of the Turkish-speaking minority remaining in Syrian territories was not guaranteed under any legal constitution. Those living in large groups managed to protect their cultural identity, however, Turkmen living in smaller groups were significantly Arabized. In any case, the minority had no rights to open Turkish schools or associations.

By the late 20th century, Dr. Larry Clark stated there was "more than 200,000" Turkmen in Syria whilst the German Orient-Institute stated that estimates ranged between 800,000 and 1 million. Numerous academics placed the Turkish-speaking Sunni Muslim population (i.e. not including Arabized or Alevi/Shia Turkmen) at approximately 3% of Syria's population, including Professor Daniel Pipes Professor Itamar Rabinovich, Professor Moshe Ma'oz, Dr. Nikolaos van Dam, Dr Henry Munson, Professor Alasdair Drysdale and Professor Raymond Hinnebusch.

=== Syrian Civil War (2011–present) ===
Since the beginning of the Syrian civil war in 2011, large numbers of Syrian Turkmen have been displaced from their homes and many have been killed due to attacks by President Bashar al-Assad's government, as well as the terrorist attacks carried out by "Islamic State of Iraq and the Levant" (ISIL). Whilst Turkmen villages in Hama, Homs, and Latakia have been destroyed by the Syrian government, Turkmen villages in Aleppo were occupied by ISIL.

Flag of Syrian Turkmen adopted by the Syrian Turkmen Assembly

Syrian Turkmens old flag

Syrian Turkmen, with the support of the Republic of Turkey, have taken up arms against the Syrian government. Several Syrian Turkmen parties united under the Syrian Turkmen Assembly, which is affiliated with the National Coalition opposition group. A Second Coastal Division was formed in 2015 and along with another extensive Turkmen militia group Sultan Murad Division, the Turkmen brigades are closely affiliated with the Free Syrian Army (FSA). Another Syrian Turkmen unit – the Seljuk Brigade and the Manbij Turkmen Brigade – have sided with the Kurdish-led People's Protection Units (YPG) and joined the US-backed Kurdish-led opposition coalition called the Syrian Democratic Forces (SDF).

==== Displacement ====
Since the beginning of the Syrian civil war many Syrian refugees (including Syrian Turkmen) have sought asylum in Turkey, Jordan, Lebanon and northern Iraq, as well as several Western European countries and Australia. Moreover, many Syrian Turkmen have also been internally displaced from their homes, forcing them to settle in other parts of Syria.

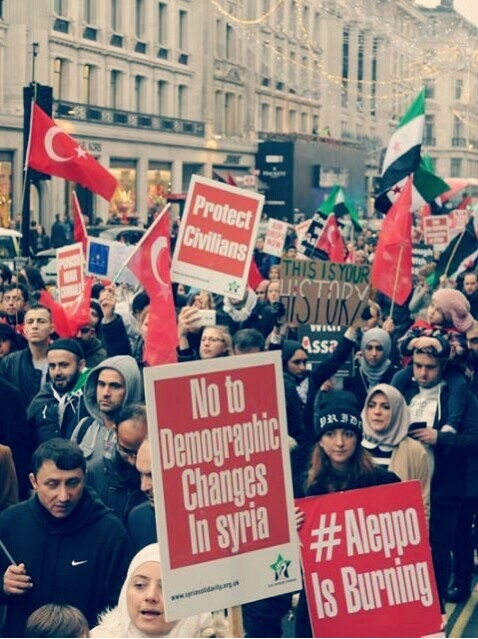
Syrian Turks waving Turkish and Syrian flags whilst shouting slogans: "No To Demographic Changes in Syria' and 'No To Genocide' during the December 2016 protests in London.

In 2012 the UN Refugee Agency had stated that Syrian Turkmen formed a significant number of the first wave of refugees who entered Turkey.

An article published by Reuters in 2015, reporting the Russian raids hitting Syrian Turkmen areas (after a Russian plane was shot down on the Turkey-Syria border), said that "Officials estimate 300,000 Turkmen used to live in northern Latakia" before the Russians "heavily targeted ethnic Turkmen areas." Al Jazeera English has also reported that the "Russian escalation of attacks on Turkmen areas" displaced "300,000 Turkmen from northern Latakia alone."

===== By the Syrian Government =====
The Syrian Government of president Bashar al-Assad, backed by Russia since 2015, have targeted several areas populated by Syrian Turkmen, as they were largely involved in anti-government attacks. On 2 February 2016, at least seven women and children were killed by Russian air strikes in a Syrian Turkmen village in the northern countryside of Homs. In the same month Russian warplanes had staged 600 strikes on Syrian Turkmen villages, displacing approximately 10,000 people.

===== By the YPG =====
There were also reports of forced displacement of Arabs, Syrian Turkmen and Kurdish civilians at the hands of the YPG from their homes in areas in the Democratic Federation of Northern Syria. In June 2015 there was concern expressed by the UN Human Rights Council regarding displacement of Syrian Turkmen from their homes in villages south of Hasakah and Tal Abyad during fighting with ISIL. Approximately 200 Syrian Turkmen refugees fled to Urfa, in southern Turkey, while 700 more fled to the eastern areas of Tal Abyad, once the YPG seized the town of Tell Hammam al-Turkman from ISIL, and there were claims that the YPG had accused the locals of collaborating with ISIL.

== Current population ==
There are no reliable estimates on the total number of ethnic minorities living in Syria because official censuses conducted under the Assad regime had only asked citizens about their religion. Therefore, Syrian citizens were not allowed to declare their ethnic origin nor their mother tongue. Dr. Abdelwahed Mekki-Berrada, in a report published by the UNHCR, points out that the majority of Syrians are considered Arab, however, this is a term based on their spoken language, and not their ethnic affiliation. Consequently, this has created difficulties in estimating the total Syrian Turkmen population, which includes both Turkish-speaking as well as Arabized Turkmen.

According to Professor Taef El-Azhari, the Syrian Turkmen “have always been the forgotten minority in the area, despite their large population.” Various professors, such as Dr. Abdelwahed Mekki-Berrada and Pierre Beckouche, have all placed the Turkish-speaking Syrian Turkmen as the third largest ethnic group in the country, after Arabs and Kurds respectively. Yet, a report published by the Arab Reform Initiative suggests that they may form the second largest ethnic group if Arabized Turkmen are also taken into account:

"Turkmen are the third largest ethnic group in Syria, making up around 4-5% of the population. Some estimations indicate that they are the second biggest group, outnumbering Kurds, drawing on the fact that Turkmen are divided into two groups: the rural Turkmen who make up 30% of the Turkmen in Syria and who have kept their mother tongue, and the urban Turkmen who have become Arabised and no longer speak their mother language. Turkmen are mostly found in the urban centres and countryside of six governorates of Syria: Aleppo, Damascus, Homs, Hama, Latakia and Quneitra." – Mustafa Khalifa (2013, published by the Arab Reform Initiative)

=== Estimates since the Syrian Civil War ===
Assistant Professor Sebastian Maisel, focusing on the Yezidis, claimed that Syrian Turkmen numbered 250,000, which constitutes approximately 1% of the population. However, Professor Pierre Beckouche stated that Sunni Muslim Turkmen alone formed 4% of the country's population before 2011, with their population estimated at approximately 1 million. Professor John Shoup has said that in 2018, the Turkish-speaking Syrian Turkmen formed around 4-5% of the population. Dr. Jonathan Spyer, as well as a report published in cooperation between the Norwegian Church Aid and the World Council of Churches, stated that the Syrian Turkmen number anywhere from 500,000 to 3 million.

=== Diaspora ===
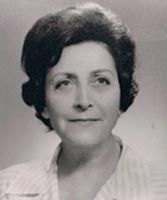
Pakize Tarzi, who was the first female Turkish gynecologist, moved to Turkey with her family after the British captured Damascus in 1918.

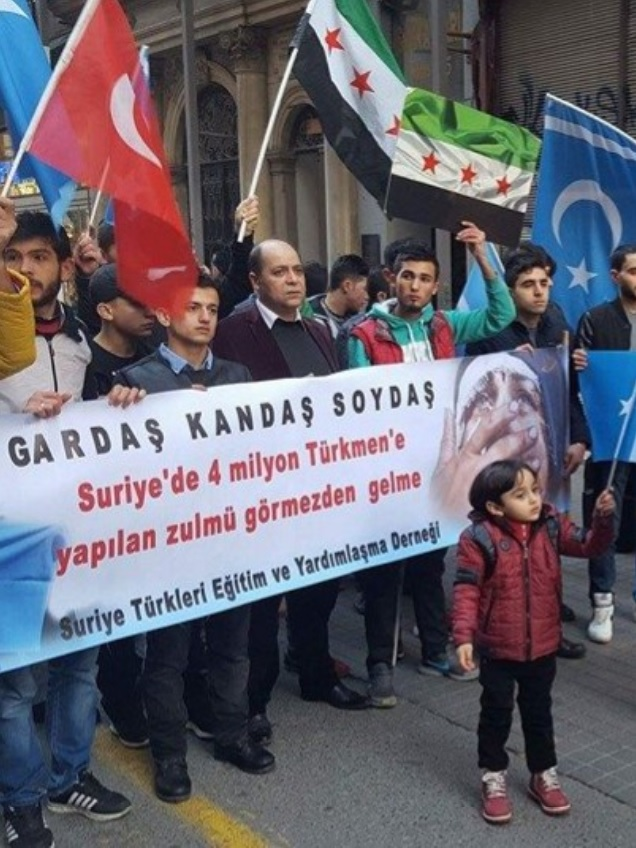
Syrian Turkmen refugees protest in Istanbul.

==== Middle East ====
===== Turkey =====
In December 2016, the Turkish Foreign Ministry Undersecretary Ümit Yalçın stated that Turkey had opened its borders to around 500,000 Syrian Turkmen. Most Syrian Turkmen settled in Istanbul, Gaziantep, Osmaniye, Hatay, Izmir, Malatya, and Konya.

In 2020, the Voice of America reported that 1,000,000 Syrian Turkmen, including their descendants, who are living in Turkey have requested to become Turkish citizens.

===== Lebanon =====
In October 2015, the Syrian independent newspaper Zaman Al Wasl reported that around 120,000 to 150,000 Syrian Turkmen were refugees in Lebanon, hence outnumbering the Turkish minority of Lebanon. By 2018, the number of Syrian Turkmen in Lebanon had increased to approximately 200,000.

===== Jordan =====
A substantial number of Syrian Turkmen refugees had also sought refuge in Jordan.

==== Europe ====
Outside of the Middle East, Syrian Turkmen refugees have mainly migrated to Western Europe, particularly Germany.

===== Germany =====
Established in Germany, the "Suriye Türkmen Kültür ve Yardımlaşma Derneği – Avrupa", or "STKYDA" (“Syrian Turkmen Culture and Solidarity Association – Europe”), was the first Syrian Turkmen association to be launched in Europe. It was established in order to help the growing Syrian Turkmen community, which arrived to the country as part of the European migrant crisis, which started in 2014 and saw its peak in 2015. The association includes Syrian Turkmen youth activists who originate from various Syrian cities and now reside across Western Europe.

== Areas of settlement ==
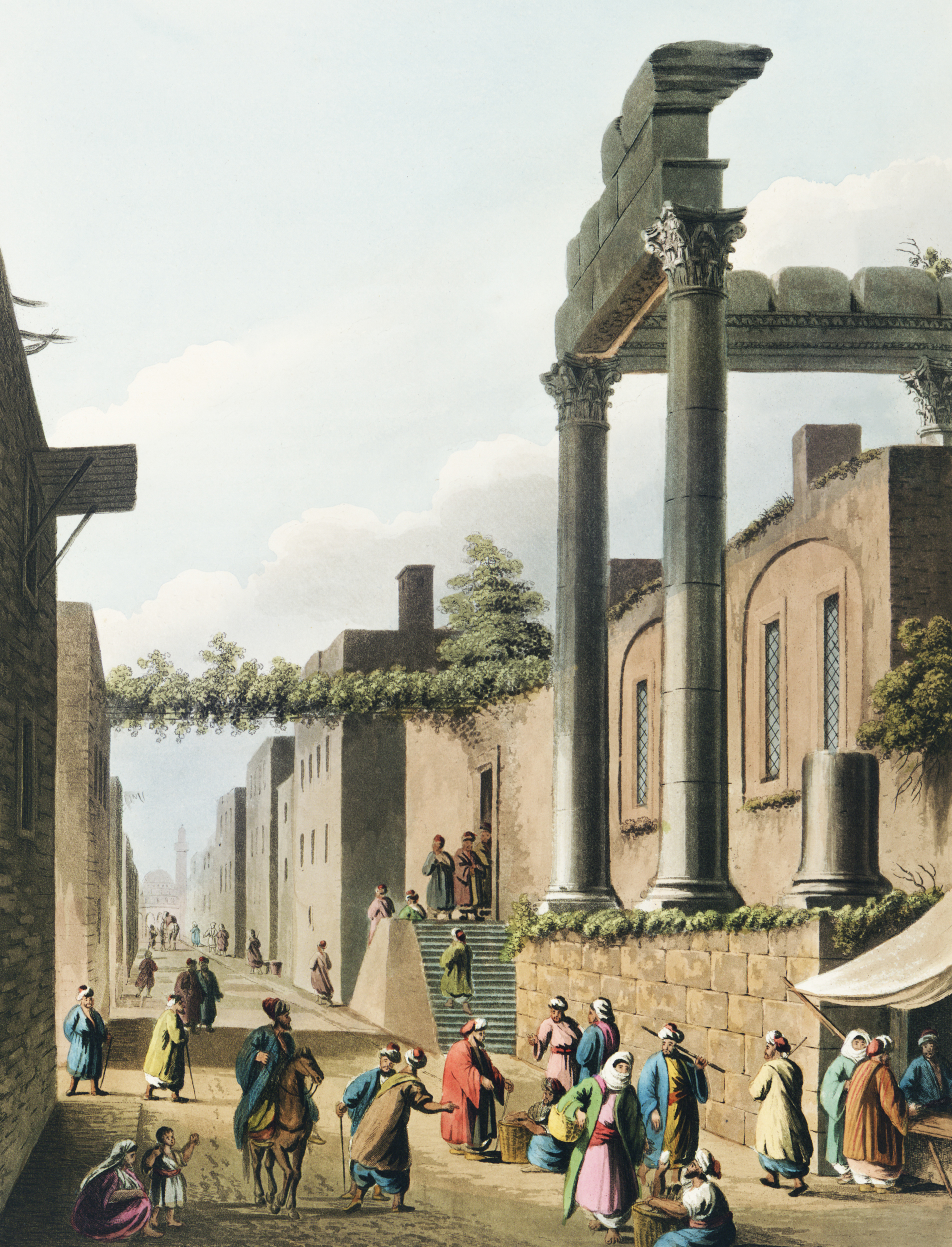
Latakia has traditionally had a strong Turkmen settlement.

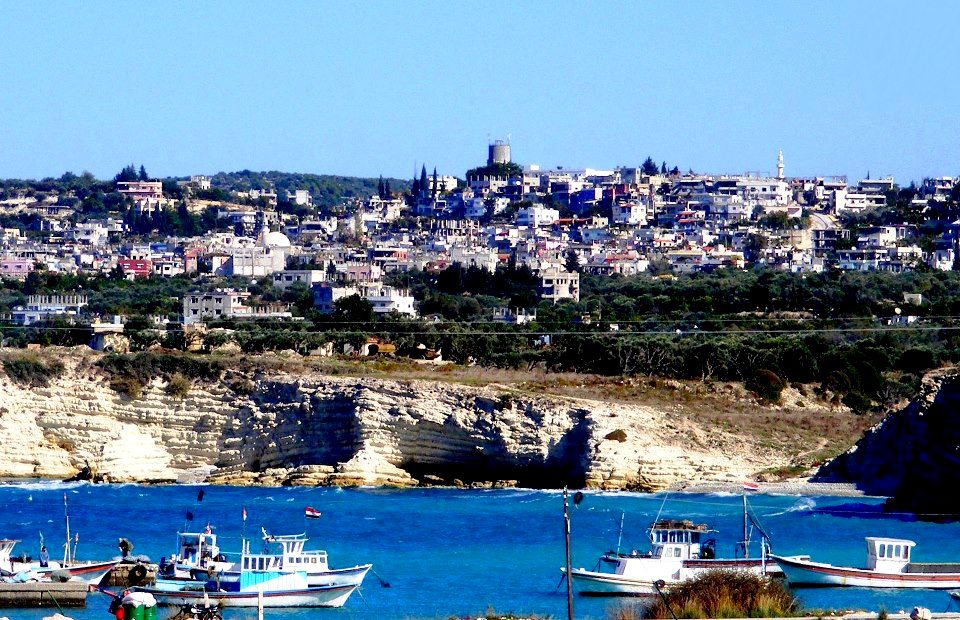
The town of Salib al-Turkman (Turkish: Sılayip Türkmen) is mostly populated by Syrian Turkmen.

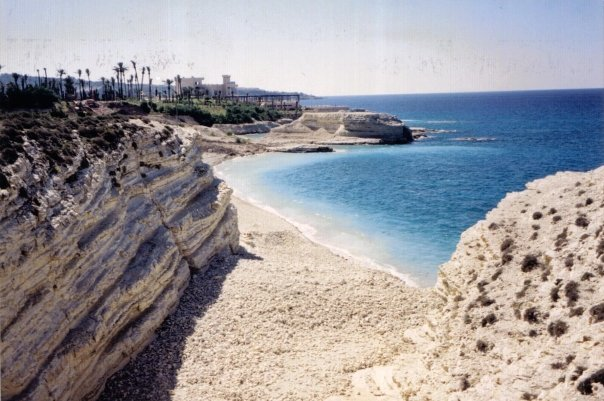
The village of Burj Islam is mostly populated by Syrian Turkmen.

Most Syrian Turkmen live in the area around the northern Euphrates, near the Syrian-Turkish border; however, they are also scattered throughout several governorates, stretching towards central Syria and the southern region near the Golan Heights. In particular, the Turkmen are concentrated in the urban centers and countryside of six governorates of Syria: in the Aleppo Governorate, the Damascus Governorate, the Homs Governorate, the Hama Governorate, the Latakia Governorate and the Quneitra Governorate. There are also smaller Turkmen communities living in the Daraa Governorate; as well as in Tartous, Raqqa, and Idlib governorates.

In the Aleppo governorate, the main locales in which the Turkmen live include the city of Aleppo (with Bustan al-Basha, Haydariyah, Hllok, Sheikh Hizir, Sheikh Feriz, Saladdin, Owaijah being neighborhoods with ethnic Turkmen populations) and the countryside in the northern part of the governorate. They also live in the villages next to the cities of Azaz, Al-Bab, and Jarabulus. Al-Rai is also a Turkmen-dominated town. There are 16 Turkmen-dominated villages south of Mount Simeon, 17 Turkmen villages in the district of Azaz, 29 villages to the east of that region, 3 villages connected to Aleppo, 69 villages around Al-Rai, 26 villages in the vicinity of Jarabulus, and 23 villages south of Sajur River.

In the Latakia governorate the Turkmen live mostly in the Turkmen Mountains (Jabal al-Turkman), Al-Badrusiyah, Umm al-Tuyour, and in various villages near the Syrian-Turkish border. There is also a number of Turkmen districts, including Bayırbucak and Jimmel Harresi where there are many Turkmen villages.

In the Damascus governorate the Turkmen live in the city of Damascus, and Harret Al Turkman is a Turkmen district where Turkish is predominantly spoken. In the Homs governorate the Turkmen mostly live in the city of Homs and the surrounding villages, such as Kara Avshar, Inallu, and Kapushak. They also live in Gharnatah, Al-Krad, Burj Qa'i, al-Sam'lil, and in villages in the Houla plain. In the Hama governorate the Turkmen live in the city of Hama and are also scattered in numerous villages around the district. For example, Baba Amir Haras is a prominent Turkmen district. There are also Turkmen living in Aqrab and Talaf. In the Quneitra governorate the Turkmen are scattered in numerous villages in the districts of Quneitra. They predominantly reside in the villages of Dababiye, Rezaniye, Sindiyane, Aynul Kara, Aynul Simsim, Ulayka, Aynul Alak, Ahmediye, Kafer Nafah, Mugir, Hafir, Hüseyniye, and Ayn Ayse.

== Culture ==
=== Language ===
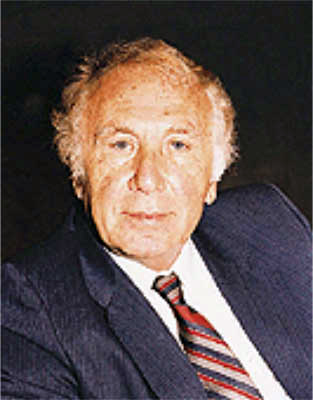
The Syrian poet Nizar Qabbani, whose mom was of Turkish origin.

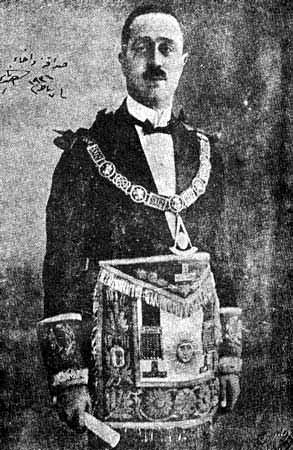
Of Turkish origin, Ahmad Nami was the 5th Prime Minister and 2nd President of Syria. His first language was Turkish, consequently, he "could hardly speak Arabic".

According to The Encyclopedia of Arabic Language and Linguistics, the Turkish language is the third most widely used language in Syria (after Arabic and Kurdish). It is spoken by the Turkmen minority mostly in villages east of the Euphrates, north of Aleppo, and on the northern coast of the country, along the Syrian-Turkish border. In addition, there are Turkish language islands in the Qalamun area and the Homs area. Moreover, Syrian Arabic dialects have also borrowed many loanwords from Turkish. Mustafa Khalifa claims that, Turkmen are divided into two groups: Rural Turkish-speaking Turkmen, constituting 30% of Syrian Turkmen, and Urban Arabic-speaking Turkmen.

Various dialects of Turkish are spoken throughout Syria: in Aleppo they speak a Kilis and Antep dialect; in Tell Abyad and Raqqa they speak an Urfa dialect; and in Bayırbucak they speak a Hatay/Yayladağı dialect of the Turkish language. Some Syrian Turkmen living far from the Turkish border, such as in Homs, have managed to preserve their national identity but are more competent in speaking the Arabic language. In Damascus Syrian Turkmen speak the Turkish language of a Yörük dialect.

In 2018 Dr. Eldad J. Pardo and Maya Jacobi reported that they did not identify any Turkish (nor Kurdish or Aramaic) teaching, either as a first or second language, in the Syrian national curriculum.

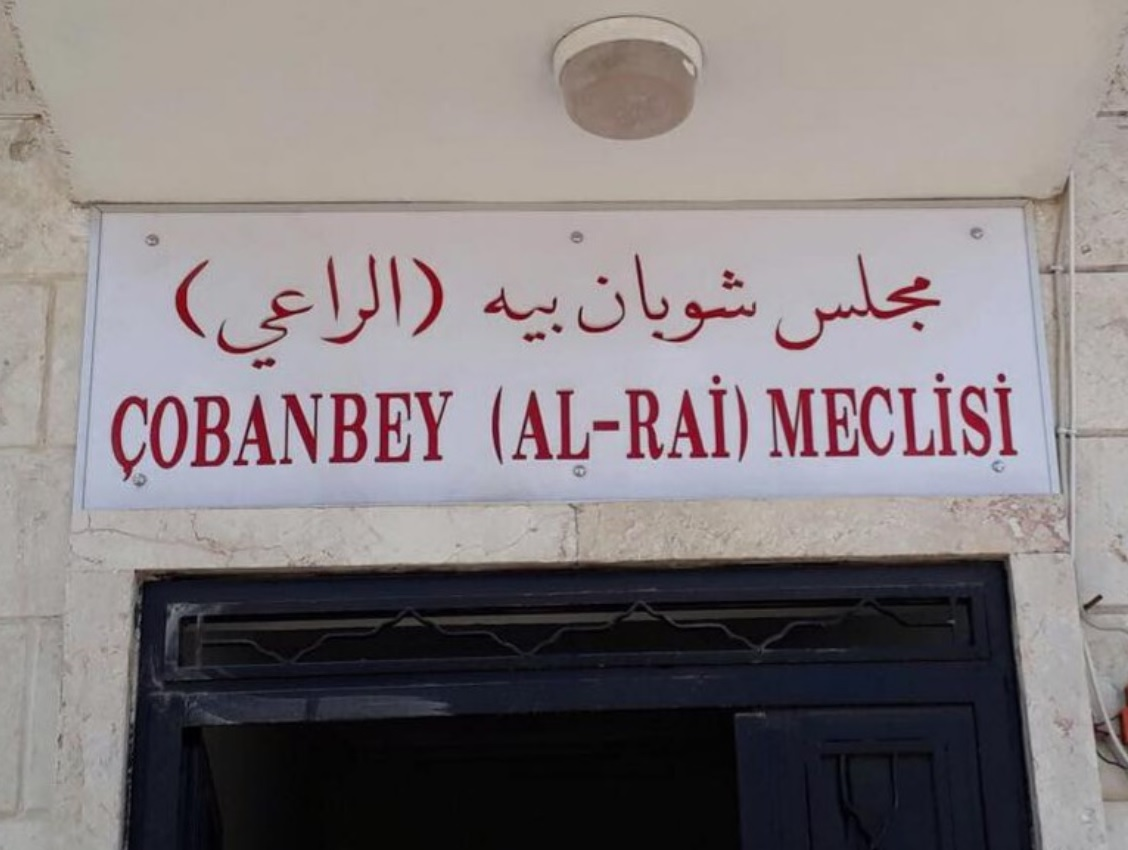
Bilingual sign (Arabic and Turkish) of Al-Rai Council.

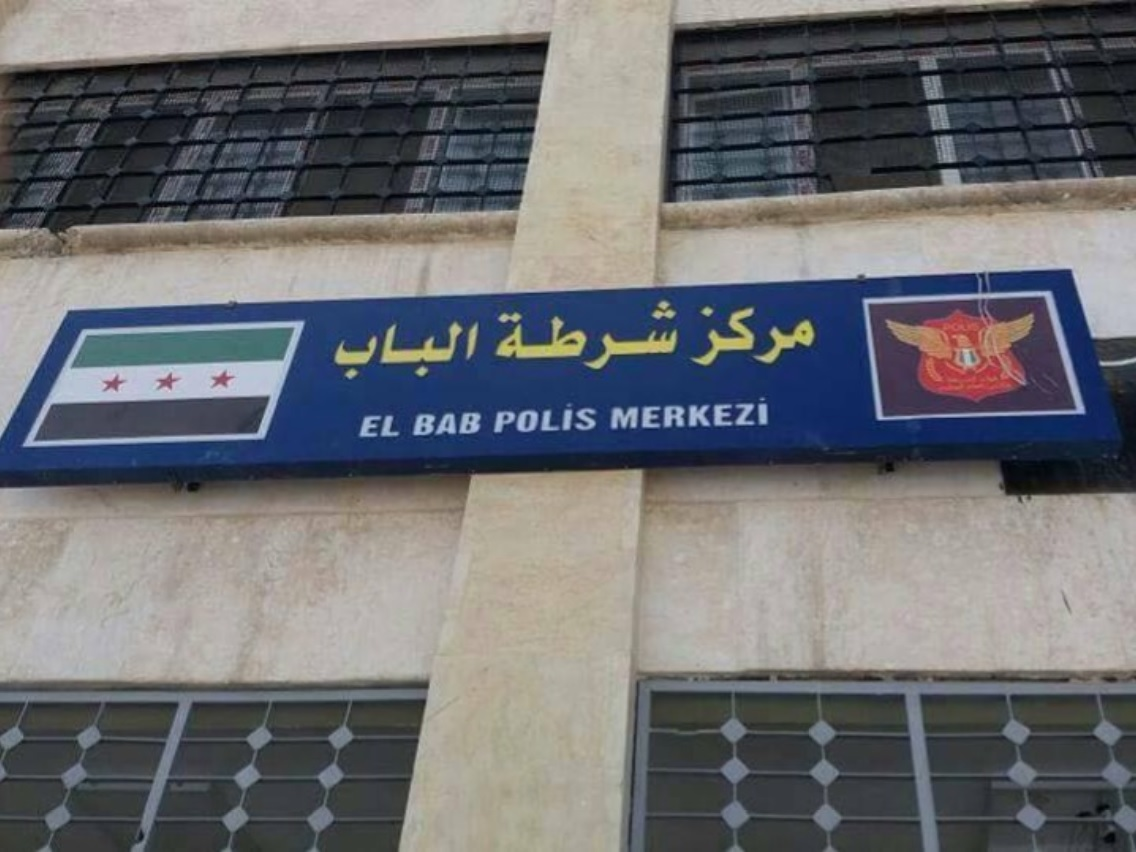
Bilingual sign (Arabic and Turkish) of Al-Bab police station.

=== Religion ===
The majority of Syrian Turkmen are Sunni Muslims, but there is also a small minority of Turkmen who are Shia Muslims (particularly Alevis and Bektashis). Ali Öztürkmen claims that the Turkmen community is 99% Sunni whilst the remainder (1%) practice Shia Islam.

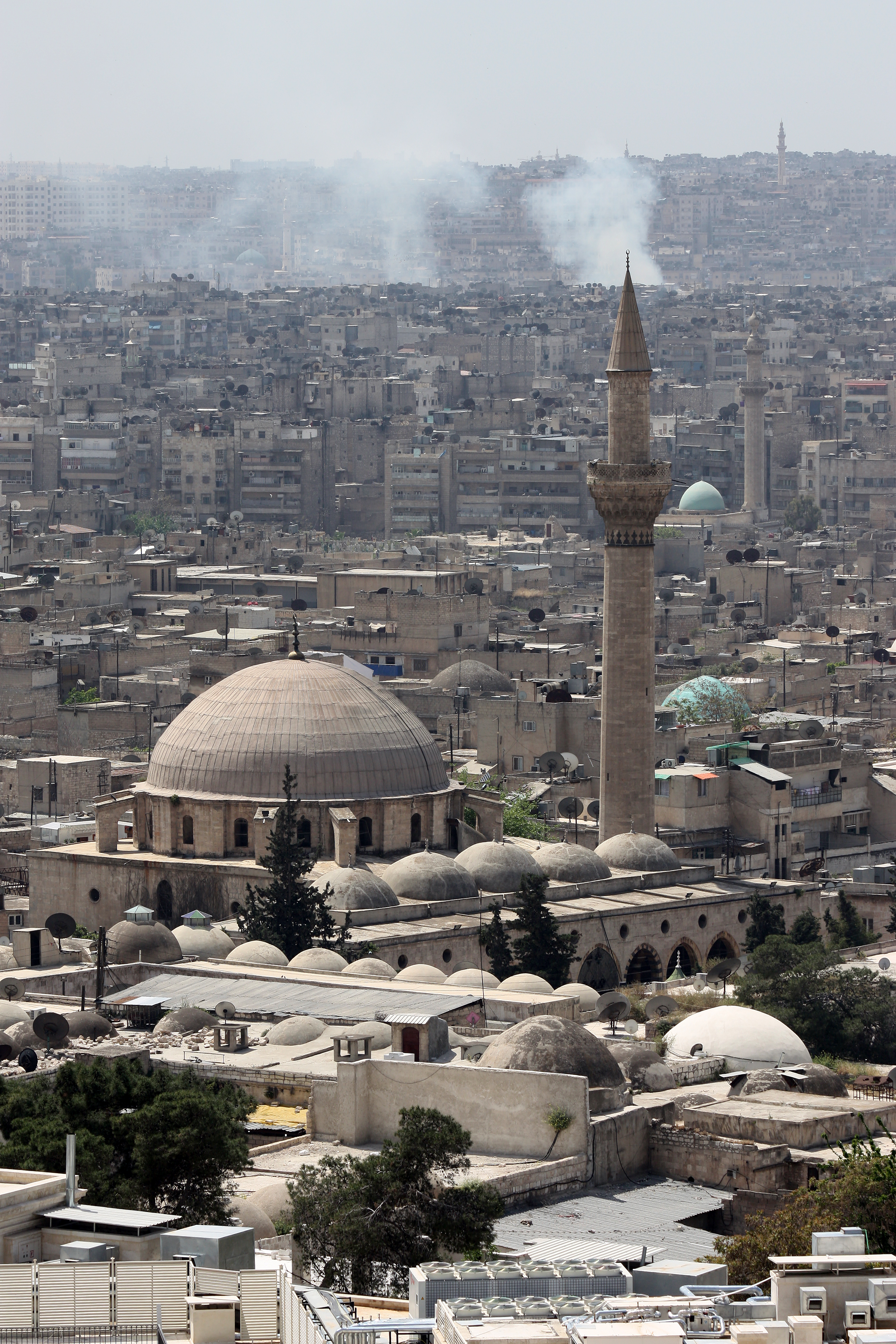
The Al-Adiliyah Mosque (Turkish: Adliye Camii) in Aleppo was built by the Ottomans in 1566.

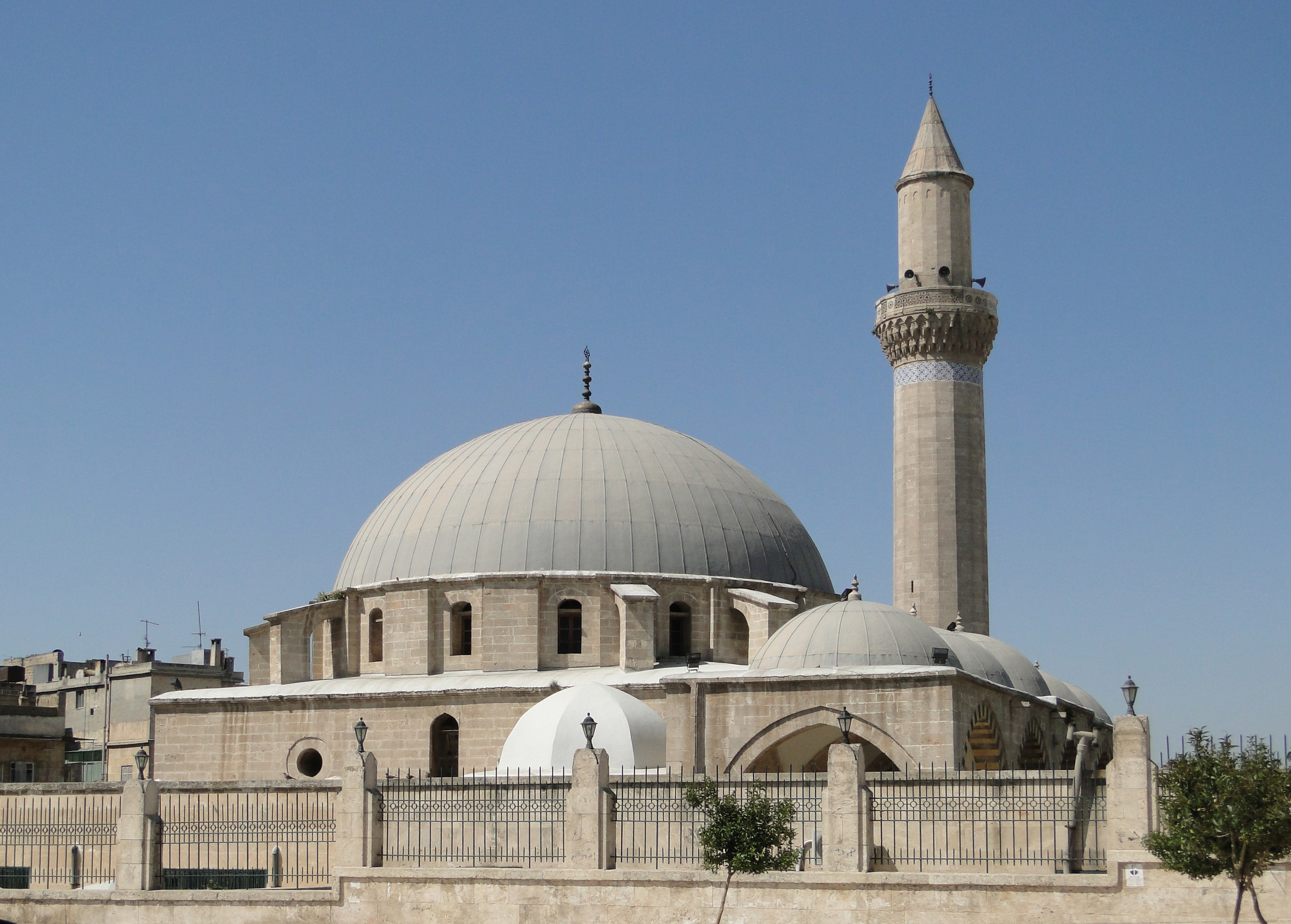
The Khusruwiyah Mosque (Turkish: Hüsreviye Camii) in Aleppo was built by the Ottomans in 1547.

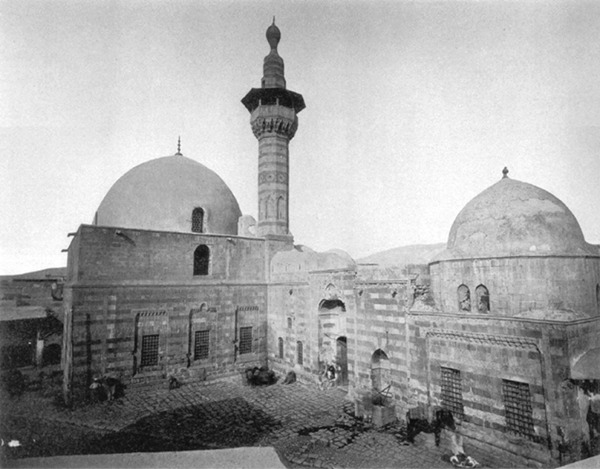
The Murad Pasha Mosque (Turkish: Şam Murat Paşa Camii) in Damascus was built by the Ottomans in 1568.

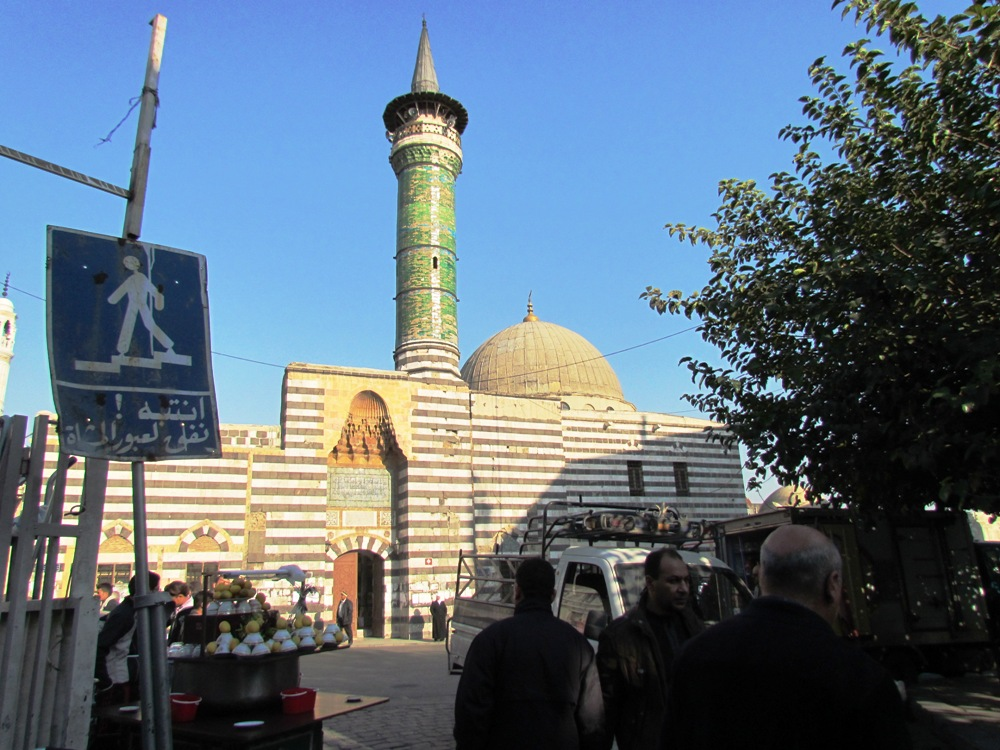
The Sinan Pasha Mosque (Turkish: Sinan Paşa Camii) in Damascus was built by the Ottomans in 1590.

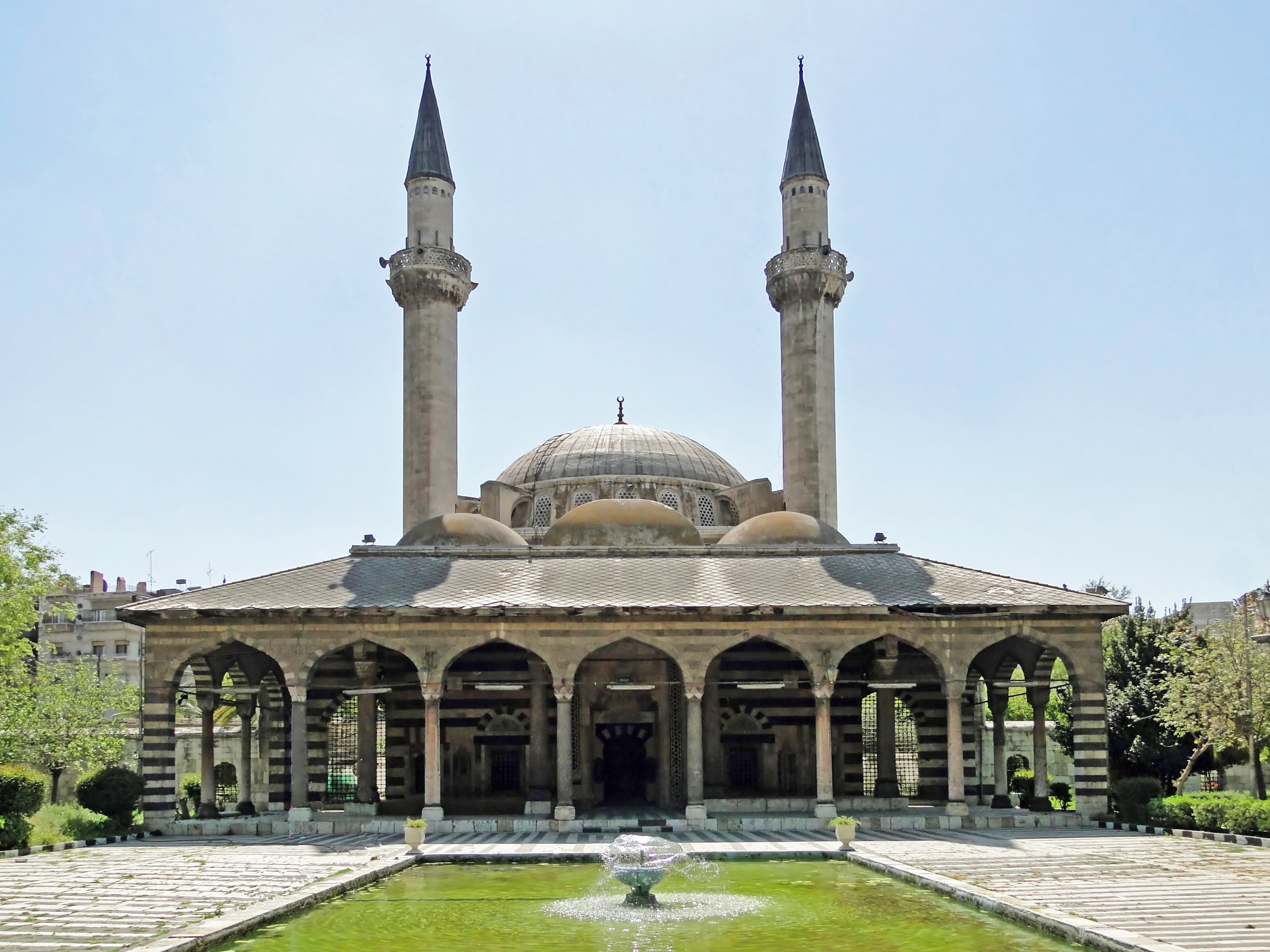
The Sulaymaniyya Takiyya (known in Turkish as Şam Süleymaniye Külliyesi) in Damascus was built by the Ottomans in the sixteenth century.

There are also some Syrian "Nawar people" (a derogatory term for people who live a mobile lifestyle – often described as "gypsies") who speak Turkish, some of whom self-identify as Turkmen; those practicing Islam belong to the Sunni, Shiite, and Alevi/Bektashi religious groups. There are also some who practice Christianity.

== Discrimination ==
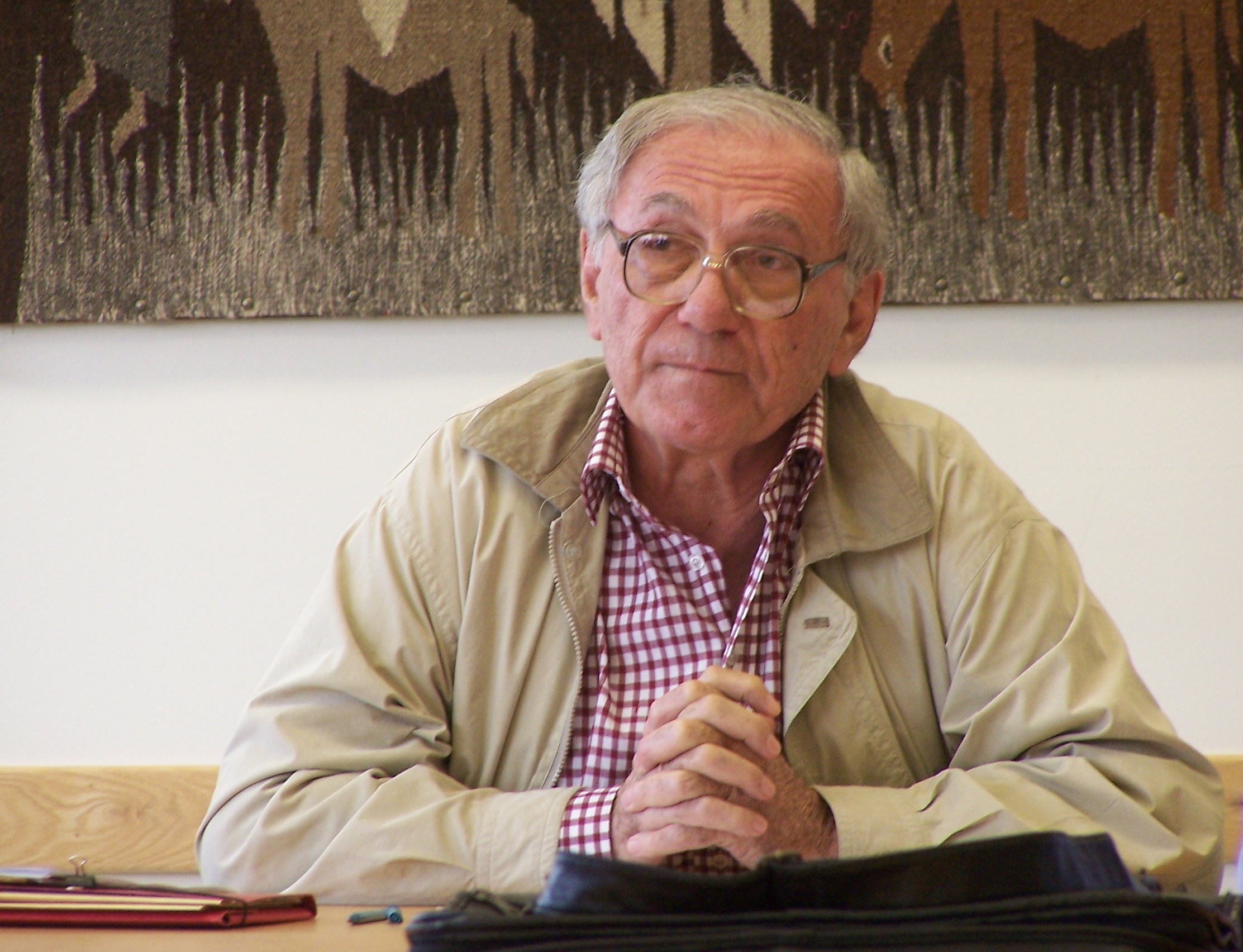
Of Turkish origin, Professor Sadiq Jalal al-Azm was known as a human rights advocate and a champion of intellectual freedom and free speech.

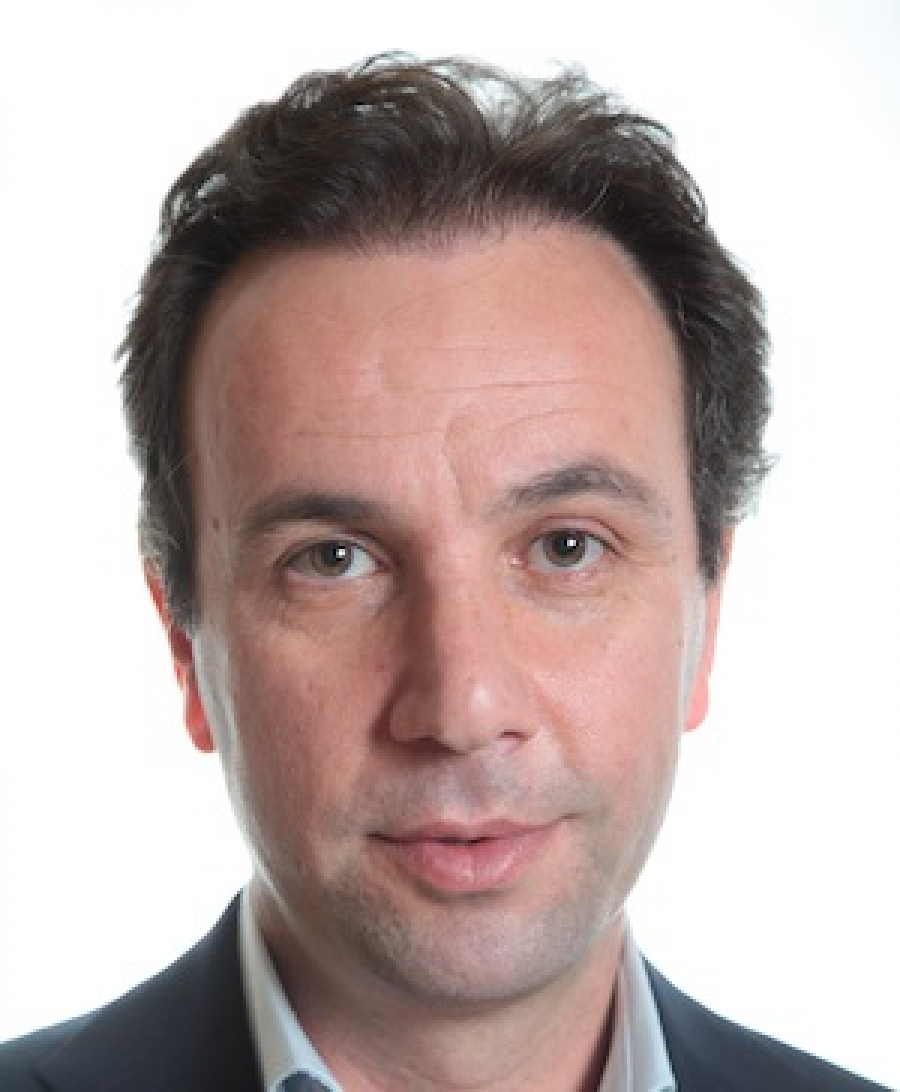
Khaled Khoja, of Turkish origin, was the president of the National Coalition for Syrian Revolutionary and Opposition Forces from 2015 to 2016.

From the French mandate era to the Assad regime, the Turkish culture and language have perished for a section of the Syrian Turkmen community. Many Syrian Turkmen have become Arabized and indistinguishable from the Arabs in areas where they form a minority. Consequently, Arabization is mainly an exception in areas where the Syrian Turkmen live in areas where they form a significant population, where they have continued to maintain their Turkish identity and language despite discriminative state policies.

Under the rule of Hafez al-Assad, there has been a ban on Syrian Turkmen communities from publishing works in Turkish.

Syrian Turkmen occupied a low rung on the societal ladder, as reported by Al Bawaba, it was stated that Assad always sought to benefit his politically dominant Alawite religious minority. The report quoted Bayırbucak Turkmen as highlighting, "They would take Alawites first no matter what, even if they had degrees, Turkmen couldn't find jobs".

== Notable people ==
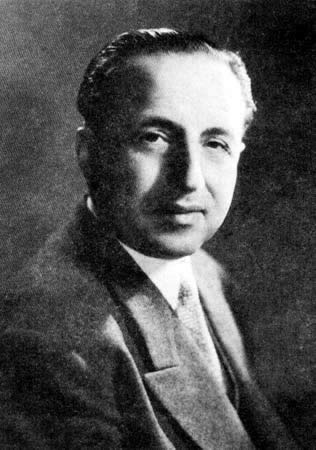
Bashir al-Azma served as the Prime Minister of Syria. His family, the Al-Azms, were of Turkish descent.

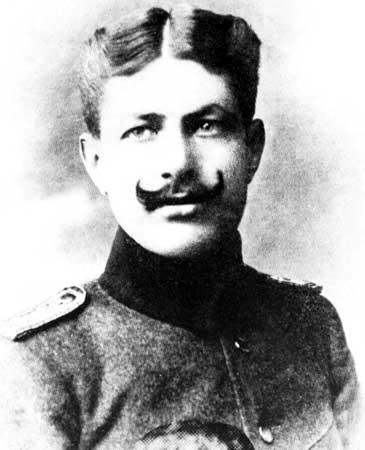
From a Turkmen family, Yusuf al-Azma was the Minister of War and Chief of General Staff of Syria.

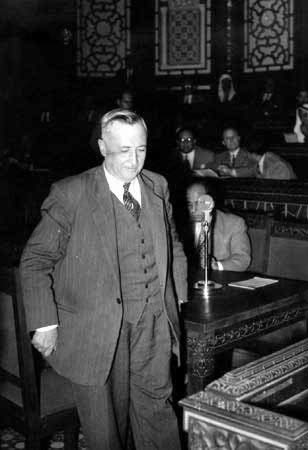
Of Turkish origin, Said al-Ghazzi was the Prime Minister of Syria in 1954 and then in 1955–56.

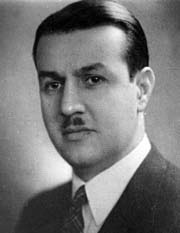
Damascus-born Suat Hayri Ürgüplü served as the 11th Prime Minister of Turkey in 1965.

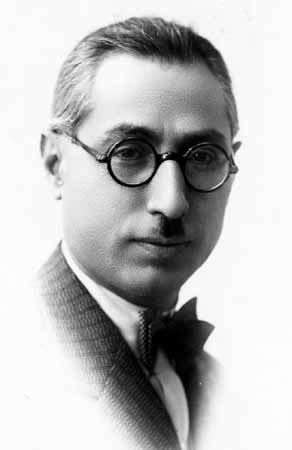
Of Turkish origin, Jamil Mardam Bey was the 21st Prime Minister of Syria.

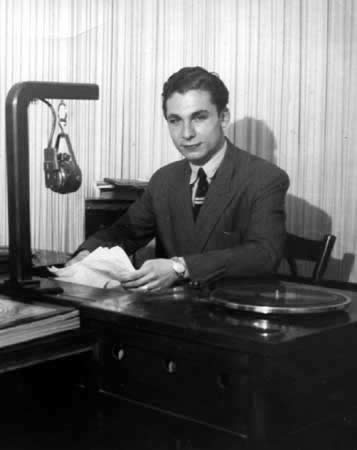
Sabah Qabbani, of Turkish origin, was the 5th Ambassador of Syria to the United States, taking office in 1974.

Several Turkish families, such as the al-Atassi (Atasi), Bey Kanj Pasha Zadeh (Genç Yussef Pasha 1807–1811), Qawuqji, Quwwatli (Kuvvetli) and Shishakli (Çiçekçi), continued to rule Syria as Prime Ministers or Presidents. However, by the 1960s the pan-Arab Baathist movement of the Al-Assad family sidelined Turkmen from politics.

- Armande Altaï, French singer
- Akshamsaddin, Ottoman religious scholar
- Kanj Yousef Pasha Zadeh, Genç Pasha-Zadeh, Ottoman governor of Damascus state 1807–1811.
- Adel al-Azma, Politician
- Bashir al-Azma, Prime Minister of Syria (1962)
- Nabih Al-Azma, Minister of Interior in Jordan (1925)
- Yasser al-Azma, Actor
- Yusuf al-'Azma, Minister of War in Syria (1920)
- Aziz al-Azmeh
- Subhi Barakat, first President of Syria (1922–1925)
- Mardam Bey family:
  - Adnan Mardam Bey, lawyer, playwright and poet
  - Farouk Mardam-Bey, French librarian, historian and publisher
  - Ghada Mardam Bey, First program director on Syrian TV
  - Haydar Mardam Bey, diplomat
  - Jamil Mardam Bey, Prime Minister of Syria (1936–1939)
  - Khaled Mardam-Bey, British software developer and creator of mIRC
  - Khalil Mardam Bey, Composer of the Syrian National Anthem
  - Rashid Pasha Mardam Bey, judge
  - Salma Mardam Bey, Writer
  - Sami Mardam-Bey, politician who was elected deputy and vice-president of the Syrian federation
- Mohammed al-Bezm (ar), Poet
- Cemil Bilsel, Turkish politician and academic
- Emin Bozoğlan, Second President of the Syrian Turkmen Assembly (2016–present)
- Mehmed Fuad Carim, Turkish politician
- Thanaa Debsi, Actress
- Tharaa Debsi, Actress
- Mohammad Emadi, Minister of Economy and Foreign Trade
- Nadia al-Ghazzi, Lawyer, writer, TV presenter
- Said al-Ghazzi, Prime Minister of Syria (in 1954 and 1955–56)
- Mennel Ibtissem, singer (contestant on The Voice France)
- Khaled Khoja, President of the Syrian National Coalition (2015–2016)
- Mehmet Muhittin Kurtiş, Turkish soldier
- Sanharib Malki, football player
- Taqi ad-Din Muhammad ibn Ma'ruf, Polymath
- Ghaith Mofeed, artist
- Abdurrahman Mustafa, First President of the Syrian Turkmen Assembly (2012–2016)
- Huda Naamani, Feminist writer
- Mustafa Naima, Ottoman historian
- Ahmad Nami, second President of Syria (1926–1928) and Ottoman damat
- Mahmud Kâmil Pasha, General of the Ottoman army
- Zeki Pasha, Ottoman Turkish field marshal
- Abu Khalil Qabbani, playwright and composer
- Nizar Qabbani, diplomat, poet and publisher, maternally Turkish
- Shukri al-Quwatli, First president of post-independence Syria (1943–1949) and (1955–1958).
- Aliye Rona, Turkish actress
- Reşit Ronabar, Ottoman governor and Turkish politician
- Suleyman Shah
- Hala Shawkat, Actress
- Adib Shishakli, Prime Minister and President of Syria (1953–1954)
- Talal Silo, former Syrian Democratic Forces spokesperson.
- Adil Şan, Singer
- Mehmet Şandır (tr), Turkish politician
- Pakize Tarzi, Turkey's first female gynaecologist
- Mustafa Tlass, Syrian Minister of Defense in (1972–2004)
  - children:
  - Manaf Tlass, former Brigadier General
  - Firas Tlass, business tycoon
- Hasan Turkmani, Minister of Defense (2004–2009)
  - children:
  - Bilal Turkmani, owner of the Syrian weekly Abyad wa Aswad
- Rim Turkmani, astrophysicist
- Refi Cevat Ulunay (tr), Turkish writer
- Suat Hayri Ürgüplü, Prime Minister of Turkey (1965)
- Necdet Yılmaz (tr), Turkish politician
- Husni al-Za'im, President of Syria (1949)
- Muhammed Habes, Jarabulus Civilian Council President (since August 2016)
- Ahmed Othman, Old SAA colonel, leader of Sultan Murad Division since 2013
- Nur ad-Din Zengi, a member of the Turkish Zengid dynasty which ruled the Syrian province of the Seljuk Empire.
- Imad ad-Din Zengi, a Turkish atabeg who ruled Mosul, Aleppo, Hama, and Edessa. He was the namesake of the Zengid dynasty.
- Tutush I, Seljuk Emir of Damascus.
- Aq Sunqur al-Hajib, Seljuk governor of Aleppo.

== See also ==
- List of armed groups in the Syrian Civil War
  - Syrian Democratic Turkmen Movement
  - Syria Turkmen Bloc
- Syria–Turkey relations
  - Hatay Province
  - Tomb of Suleyman Shah
- Turkish military intervention in Syria
  - Northern al-Bab offensive (2016)
  - Battle of al-Rai (August 2016)
- Turkish minorities in the former Ottoman Empire
  - Turks in the Arab world
    - Iraqi Turkmen
    - Turks in Lebanon
    - Turks in Egypt
- Arabs in Turkey

== Bibliography ==
- Ayalon, David (2016). Islam and the Abode of War: Military Slaves and Islamic Adversaries. Routledge. ISBN 978-0860784302.
- Amnesty International (October 2015). "Syria: 'We Had Nowhere to Go' – Forced Displacement and Demolitions in Northern Syria" (PDF). Peter Benenson House. Archived from the original on 13 October 2015.
- Behnstedt, Peter (2008). "Syria". In Versteegh, Kees; Eid, Mushira; Elgibali, Alaa; Woidich, Manfred; Zaborski, Andrzej (eds.). Encyclopedia of Arabic Language and Linguistics. Vol. 4. Brill Publishers. ISBN 978-90-04-14476-7.
- Bianquis, Thierry (1993). "Mirdās, Banū or Mirdāsids". In Bosworth, C. E.; van Donzel, E.; Heinrichs, W. P. & Pellat, Ch. (eds.). The Encyclopaedia of Islam, Second Edition. Volume VII: Mif–Naz. Leiden: E. J. Brill. pp. 115–123. doi:10.1163/1573-3912_islam_SIM_5220. ISBN 978-90-04-09419-2.
- Bozoğlan, Emin (October 2016). "Cerablus'taki Uygulamalar Suriye'nin Geleceğine Dair Başarılı Bir Yönetim Modeli Ortaya Koymaktadır" (PDF). ORSAM Bölgesel Gelişmeler Söyleşileri. 36. Archived (PDF) from the original on 18 October 2016.
- Chatty, Dawn (2018). Syria: The Making and Unmaking of a Refuge State. Oxford University Press. ISBN 978-0-19-091134-8.
- Commins, David Dean (2004). Historical Dictionary of Syria. Scarecrow Press. ISBN 978-0-8108-4934-1.
- Cooke, Miriam (2007). Dissident Syria: Making Oppositional Arts Ffficial. Duke University Press. ISBN 978-0-8223-4035-5.
- Cuinet, Vital (1890–1895). La Turquie d'Asie: Géographie Administrative, Statistique, Descriptive et Raisonnée de Chaque Province de l'Asie-Mineure. Paris: Ernest Leroux.
- Deutsches Orient–Institut (1996), Nahost-Informationsdienst : Presseausschnitte zu Politik, Wirtschaft und Gesellschaft in Nordafrika und dem Nahen und Mittleren Osten, Deutsches Orient Institut, ISSN 0949-1856
- Etheredge, Laura (2012). Middle East Region in Transition: Syria, Lebanon, and Jordan. Britannica Educational Publishing. ISBN 978-1-61530-329-8.
- Hartmann, Martin (2012). Reisebriefe aus Syrien (in German). Books on Demand. ISBN 978-3-86444-801-0.
- Hatahet, Sinan; Aldassouky, Ayman (2017). "Forced Demographic Changes in Syria". Al Sharq Forum. Archived from the original on 12 June 2018.
- Hürmüzlü, Erşat (2015). "The Turkmens of the Middle East" (PDF). Turkish Policy Quarterly. 14 (1). Archived (PDF) from the original on 12 June 2018.
- Khalifa, Mustafa (2013). "The Impossible Partition of Syria". Arab Reform Initiative.
- Ma'oz, Moshe (1973). "Syria". In Milson, Menahem (ed.). Society and Political Structure in the Arab World. Humanities Press. ISBN 978-0-391-00258-6.
- McHugo, John (2014). Syria: A Recent History. Saqi Books. ISBN 978-0-86356-763-6.
- Moubayed, Sami M. (2000). Damascus Between Democracy and Dictatorship. University Press of America. ISBN 978-0-7618-1744-4.
- Munson, Henry (1988). Islam and Revolution in the Middle East. Yale University Press. ISBN 978-0-300-04604-5.
- Mustafa, Abdurrahman (June 2015). "The Turkmens Reality in Syria" (PDF). ORSAM Review of Regional Affairs (27). Ortadoğu Stratejik Araştırmalar Merkezi (ORSAM): 4. Archived (PDF) from the original on 9 October 2016.
- Özkaya, Abdi Noyan (2007). "Suriye Kürtleri: Siyasi Etkisizlik ve Suriye Devleti'nin Politikaları" (PDF). Review of International Law and Politics (in Turkish). 2 (8). Archived from the original (PDF) on 24 January 2011.
- Öztürkmen, Ali; Duman, Bilgay; Orhan, Oytun (2015), "Suriye'de Değişimin Ortaya Çıkardığı Toplum: Suriye Türkmenleri" (PDF), Ortadoğu Stratejik Araştırmalar Merkezi, 83, archived from the original (PDF) on 16 June 2016
- Palva, Heikki (1999). "Reviewed Work: Sprachatlas von Syrien by Peter Behnstedt". Mediterranean Language Review. 11: 200.
- Peyrouse, Sebastien (2015). Turkmenistan: Strategies of Power, Dilemmas of Development. Routledge. ISBN 978-0-230-11552-1.
- Pierre, Beckouche (2017). "The Country Reports: Syria". Europe's Mediterranean Neighbourhood. Edward Elgar Publishing. ISBN 978-1-78643-149-3.
- Pipes, Daniel (1992). Greater Syria: The History of an Ambition. Oxford University Press. ISBN 978-0-19-506022-5.
- Rabinovich, Itamar (1972). Syria Under the Ba'th, 1963–66: The Army-Party Symbiosis. Transaction Publishers. ISBN 978-0-7065-1266-3.
- Roded, Ruth (1986), "Social Patterns Among the Urban Elite of Syria During the Late Ottoman Period", in Kusher, David (ed.), Palestine in the Late Ottoman Period: Political, Social, and Economic Transformation, Brill Publishers, ISBN 978-9004077928
- Shaw, Stanford J.; Shaw, Ezel Kural (1977). History of the Ottoman Empire and Modern Turkey: Volume 2, Reform, Revolution, and Republic: The Rise of Modern Turkey 1808–1975. Cambridge University Press. ISBN 978-0-521-29166-8.
- Shora, Nawar (2008). The Arab-American Handbook: A Guide to the Arab, Arab-American & Muslim Worlds. Cune Press. p. 236. ISBN 978-1-885942-47-0.
- Taef, El-Azhari (2005). "The Turkmen Identity Crisis in the fifteenth-century Middle East: The Turkmen-Turkish Struggle for Supremacy" (PDF). Chronica. 5. Archived (PDF) from the original on 12 June 2018.
- Mekki-Berrada, Abdelwahed; Quosh, Constanze; el Chammay, Rabih; Deville-Stoetzel, JeanBenoit; Youssef, Ahmed; Jefee-Bahloul, Hussam; Barkeel-Oteo, Andres; Coutts, Adam; Song, Suzan (2015). Hassan, Ghayda; J.Kirmayer, Laurence; Ventevogel, Peter (eds.). Culture, Context and the Mental Health and Psychosocial Wellbeing of Syrians (PDF) (Report). United Nations High Commissioner for Refugees. Archived (PDF) from the original on 26 March 2016.
- Van Dam, Nikolaos (1979). The Struggle for Power in Syria. Taylor & Francis. ISBN 978-0-85664-703-1.
- Wahby, Sarah; Ahmadzadeh, Hashem; Çorabatır, Metin; Hashem, Leen; Al Husseini, Jalal (2014), Ensuring quality education for you refugees from Syria (12-25 year): a mapping exercise, Refugee Studies Centre, University of Oxford, archived from the original on 25 April 2018
- Watson, J (1999), "Sbahtû! A Course in Sancânî Arabic (A. Zaborski)", Journal of Arabic Linguistics, 36: 98
- Zakkar, Suhayl (1971). The Emirate of Aleppo: 1004–1094. Aleppo: Dar al-Amanah. OCLC 759803726.
- Ziadeh, Nicola A. (1953). Urban life in Syria under the early Mamlūks. American University of Beirut. ISBN 978-0-8371-3162-7.
- Zürcher, Erik J. (2007). Turkey: A Modern History. I.B.Tauris. ISBN 978-1-86064-958-5.
