= Nadia al-Ghazzi =

Syrian lawyer and writer (born 1935)

- Born: Nadia al-Ghazzi; 1935 (age 90–91); Damascus, Syria

Nadia al-Ghazzi (Arabic: نادية الغزي, born in 1935) is a Syrian lawyer and writer. She is also a TV presenter and was one of the first women on Syrian Television.

== Early life and career ==
Al-Ghazzi was born in Damascus, Syria, in 1935. Her father, Said al-Ghazzi, served twice as the prime minister of Syria. Her mother was Balkis Moraly. Al-Ghazzi attended Damascus University and earned a degree in National and International Law.

In 1960 Al-Ghazzi joined the founders of Syrian Television on its launch; she began editing and presenting her family program "Al-Bayt al-Said", and then a popular children's show followed in 1973–1975. She also starred in two television dramas in 1982 and 2004. Between the 1975-79 she also hosted three family-oriented talk-shows on Damascus Radio.

From 1979 Al-Ghazzi was a member and secretary of the Arabian Book Union and participated in committees to change the Syrian law, particularly for women's rights. She also began writing for several magazines, including "Tabibak" and "Al Maraa". By the early 1980s she began to publish several books and has collectively written twenty books. Her books focus on the heritage and cultural memory of Damascus and Syria.

In 2001, she published a 5-volume book series on food history, title "Food culture of the Levant and Mesopotamia".

In 2008 she was a board member of the Damascus Friends Society and a member of the Higher Committee for the celebrations held in Damascus during its tenure as 2008 Arab Capital of Culture.

== Personal life ==
She is married to Nizar Bakdounes and has three daughters: Lama, Nada and Racha.

She is related to the poet Huda Naamani.
