= Bayirbujak =

Region in northwestern of Syria

Location of Bayırbucak in Syria

Bayirbujak (Turkish: Bayırbucak; Arabic: البوجاق, romanized: Bujak), also known as West Turkmeneli (Batı Türkmeneli), is a region in northwestern Syria. It is viewed as the Syrian Turkmen homeland. Bayırbucak is divided into Bayır and Bucak, and includes the main settlements of Kessab, Ras al-Bassit, Umm al-Tuyour, Burj al-Islam, Ghimam, as well as the Turkmen Mountain region. Bayırbucak borders Hatay Province to the north, Jabal al-Akrad to the east, Latakia city to the south, and the Mediterranean Sea in the west.

== Etymology ==
Bayırbucak is a Turkish exonym, and not the official name for the region, which is Al-Rabiaa subdistrict. The word Bayırbucak comes from two different words in Turkish: bayır (en: hillside) and bucak (en: district). In Ottoman archival documents, Bayir sometimes appears as a general geographic designation or a tax farm (mukataa) but was not the official name of a district (nahiye). It is sometimes referred to as West Turkmeneli to distinguish from the Iraqi Turkmen homeland, known as East Turkmeneli.

== Notable events ==
On 24 November 2015, two Turkish F-16s shot down one of two Russian Su-24 fighter jets, which violated Turkish airspace while in an operation to attack a Turkmen rebel militia in Bayırbucak. One Russian pilot was killed by Turkmen forces under the command of Alparslan Çelik.

Heavy Russian aerial bombardments during the 2015–16 Latakia offensive resulted in a very difficult situation in the Bayırbucak Turkmen regions, causing almost all Syrian Turkmens to flee the region to Turkey.

In early July 2025, wildfires swept through the Bayırbucak region, including Qastal Ma'af and al-Furnloq Reserve, destroying over 14,000 hectares of forest and farmland. Villages were evacuated as the fires, driven by extreme heat, drought, and strong winds, spread rapidly through the rugged terrain. Efforts to contain them were hindered by unexploded ordnance and limited resources. Turkey, Jordan, and Lebanon provided firefighting support, while the UN allocated $625,000 in emergency aid. By 15 July, the fire had been contained.
