= Huda Naamani =

Syria-born Lebanese writer, poet and artist (1930–2020)

Huda Naamani (also known as Houda Naamani, Hoda Naamani, or Houda K. Al-Naamani, 2 June 1930 – 31 October 2020) was a Syrian-born Lebanese feminist writer, poet, publisher, and artist. After moving to Beirut, Naamani wrote poetry that revolved around establishing womanhood and citizenship. She was most widely known for her contributions to poetry during the Lebanese Civil War. Naamani is a Lebanese citizen.

== Biography ==
Born in Damascus, Syria on 2 June 1930, into a family of Turkish origin, she is related to the old bourgeoisie ruling family; her relative Said al-Ghazzi served as the Prime Minister of Syria during the rule of Shukri al-Quwatli. Her father, Fouad Al-Naamani, died when she was eight years old, in 1938, and she was raised by her mother, Salwa al-Ghazzi. Naamani was influenced by Sufi Islam, which allowed her to learn more about mysticism and express these ideas through poetry.

=== Education and personal life ===
Her education began at French primary and secondary schools, the Lycée-Français and later the Franciscans. Naamani studied at the Tahjiz, an official Syrian institution of learning, earning her baccalaureate. Following the completion of her studies at the Tahjiz, Naamani chose to study law by matriculating in the Syrian University's Law school. Naamani later married her distant cousin, Abdel Kader Naamani who became the first Arab Dean at the American University in Cairo. There, she matriculated in the School of Oriental Studies. She had two sons with Abdel Kader Naamani while she was studying in Egypt. Naamani returned to Beirut, Lebanon in 1968.

== Literary career ==
Namaani's true stimulation for writing about the struggles of women in the Arab World results from her experiences during the Lebanese Civil War, which took place from 1975-1990. Her works typically focus on expressing women's revolt and strength against males during the war. She describes the conditions of the country and the challenge for women to oppose the patriarchal society. Some of her poetic works include "Adkuru Kuntu Nuqtah Kuntu Da'ira" (1978) translating to "I Remember I was a Point, I was a Circle" as well as "Other" and "I" in which she illustrates the instability of the Middle East while expressing optimism for peace, love, and unity for the region and women within the region. Also, in her poems from " 'H' Tumbling on the Snow," Naamani further addresses the inequality among men and women in society as well as a woman's attempt to break such a barrier through her own power.

One of Naamani's most famous works is her English poem Rim of the Lock in which she explores individuality of the Lebanese society based on the Lebanese Civil War. She writes of the pain, violence, and atrocities that occurred during this chaotic time, while suggesting that there are tangible solutions to reach tranquility in the country. It is in poetic form and attempts to employ pathetic appeal as well as spiritual allusions to assert her vision of sadness, but also her hope for the future.

Her words have also been incorporated within another book, War's Other Voices: Women Writers on the Lebanese Civil War where Naamani is described by the writer, Miriam Cooke, as "generous" and "courageous" along with other Lebanese women writers identified as "The Beiruit Decentrist."

Some of her works published in Arabic include:

- To You (1970)
- My Fingers...Not (1971)
- Vision on a Throne (1989)
- Houda I am The Truth (1991)
- The Book of Affection and Presence (1998)
- Many Lips you have O Shepherd, Many Hands (2001)
- "A Dot" on "H"

Besides publishing one book in English, her other poems have also been translated into English:

- Rim of the Lock
- Tumbling on the Snow.

Her works have been translated in French by Clara Murner and Roula Naboulsi, Urdu by Zouhair Ashraf Gamal and Professor Qaisrah M. Alwi. Naamani has also been anthologized by Professor Christian Leshon and Miriam Cooke in Opening the Gates: An Anthology of Arab Feminist Writing .

== Later life ==
Naamani lived in Egypt, Pakistan, Saudi Arabia, and Kuwait in addition to Great Britain and the United States of America. Naamani later lived in Beirut working on literary pieces and her personal publishing. She died on 31 October 2020, at the age of 90.
