= Alparslan Çelik =

Turkish militant

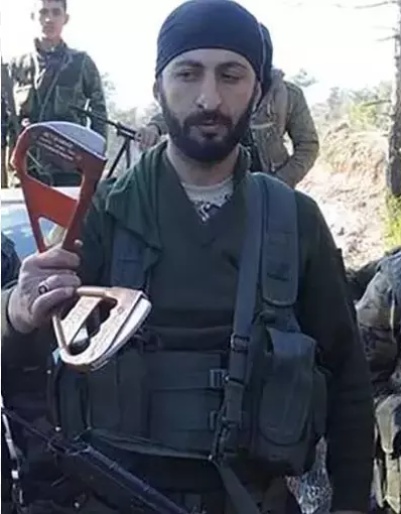
- Alparslan Çelik in 2015
- Born: 1982 (age 43–44); Keban, Turkey
- Military career
- Allegiance: Syrian Turkmen Brigades
- Service years: 2014–2016
- Rank: Second-in-command
- Unit: Turkmen Coastal Division
- Conflicts: Syrian civil war; 2015–2016 Latakia offensive; 2015 Russian Sukhoi Su-24 shootdown

Alparslan Çelik (born 1982) is a Turkish Islamist Nationalist. In 2014 he joined the Syrian Turkmen Brigades of the Free Syrian Army and fought against the Syrian Arab Army (SAA). On 24 November 2015, after Turkey shot down a Russian bomber jet, he allegedly killed the Russian pilot Oleg Peshkov. Çelik was detained in İzmir, Turkey on 31 March 2016. All charges against him were dropped on 9 May 2016. In 2017, he was sentenced to five years in prison for the illegal possession of firearms in a separate case.

His father Ramazan Çelik was the Mayor of Keban for the Nationalist Movement Party
