= Syrian Turkmen Assembly =

Coalition of Syrian Turkmen political parties

Syrian Turkmen Assembly Suriye Türkmen Meclisi الجمعية التركمانية السورية
- Logo of the Syrian Turkmen Assembly
- Abbreviation: STM
- President: Abdurrahman Mustafa
- Vice President: Hüseyin İsa
- Secretary General: Muhammed Favvaz Şimali
- Founded: 15 December 2012; 13 years ago
- Headquarters: Al-Rai, Aleppo, Syria
- Armed wing: Syrian Turkmen Brigades (2012–2025)
- Student wing: Syrian Turkmen Student Union
- Women's wing: Syrian Turkmen Women's Union
- Ideology: Turkmen minority politics Minority rights
- National affiliation: Syrian National Coalition (2013–2025)
- Member parties: Syria Turkmen Bloc; Syrian Democratic Turkmen Movement
- Colours: Turquoise; Gold
- People's Assembly: 1 / 210

Party flag
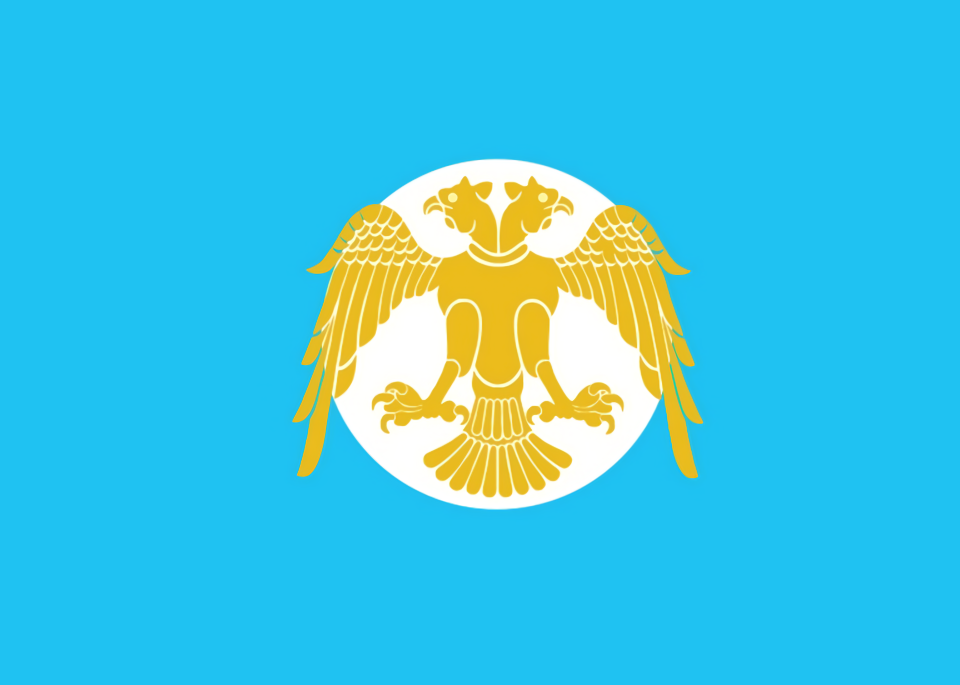

Website
- stmeclisi.com

The Syrian Turkmen Assembly (Turkish: Suriye Türkmen Meclisi, Arabic: المجلس السوري التركماني) is a political coalition representing the interests of the Syrian Turkmens. Founded in December 2012 as the Syrian Turkmen Platform (Suriye Türkmenleri Platformu), it was established to unite the principal Syrian Turkmen political movements, including the Syrian Turkmen Bloc and the Syrian Democratic Turkmen Movement.

Throughout the Syrian civil war, the Assembly served as the principal political representative of the Syrian Turkmen opposition. It participated in the Syrian National Council and later the Syrian National Coalition, representing the Turkmen community in opposition institutions and at international negotiations, including the Geneva peace talks in 2016. Following the fall of the Assad regime in December 2024 and the dissolution of the Syrian National Coalition in 2025, the Assembly has continued to operate as an independent representative body for the Syrian Turkmen community.

The Assembly advocates the safe return of displaced Syrian Turkmens, constitutional guarantees for their linguistic, cultural, political, economic, and social rights, and the establishment of a democratic constitutional order in Syria that ensures equal rights for all citizens. Throughout the civil war, it maintained close political ties with the Syrian Turkmen Brigades, a coalition of predominantly Turkmen armed groups aligned with the Syrian opposition. These factions fought alongside the Syrian opposition against the Syrian government and other armed actors, including the Islamic State and the People's Protection Units (YPG).

== History ==
The first meeting of the Syrian Turkmen Platform was held in Istanbul on 15 December 2012. Delegates argued that Syrian Turkmens were underrepresented within the Syrian National Coalition and adopted a declaration calling for a future Syrian state in which all citizens would live together regardless of ethnic or religious identity.

The second congress of the Syrian Turkmen Platform was held in Ankara on 30 March 2013. It was attended by Turkish Prime Minister Recep Tayyip Erdoğan, Foreign Minister Ahmet Davutoğlu, and George Sabra, then acting president of the National Coalition for Syrian Revolutionary and Opposition Forces. During the meeting, Davutoğlu called on Syrian Turkmens to play a more active role within the Syrian opposition and in the future governance of Syria.

In response, approximately 350 delegates representing Turkmen communities from across Syria elected 39 members to the newly established Syrian Turkmen Assembly, which succeeded the Syrian Turkmen Platform as the principal representative body of the community. The Assembly brought together the Syrian Turkmen National Bloc and the Syrian Democratic Turkmen Movement, the two main Turkmen political organizations, under a common institutional framework. The congress also resolved that the Assembly would be renewed annually and convene quarterly.

Following its establishment, the Assembly secured representation within the Syrian National Council and the National Coalition for Syrian Revolutionary and Opposition Forces, becoming the principal political voice of the Syrian Turkmen opposition during the Syrian civil war.

On 31 December 2019, the Assembly announced that it would relocate its headquarters to Al-Rai, Syria, publishing photographs of its new unfinished premises on its official Facebook page. On 1 July 2026, Abdurrahman Mustafa was appointed as a member of the People's Assembly by Syrian president Ahmed al-Sharaa.

== Gallery ==
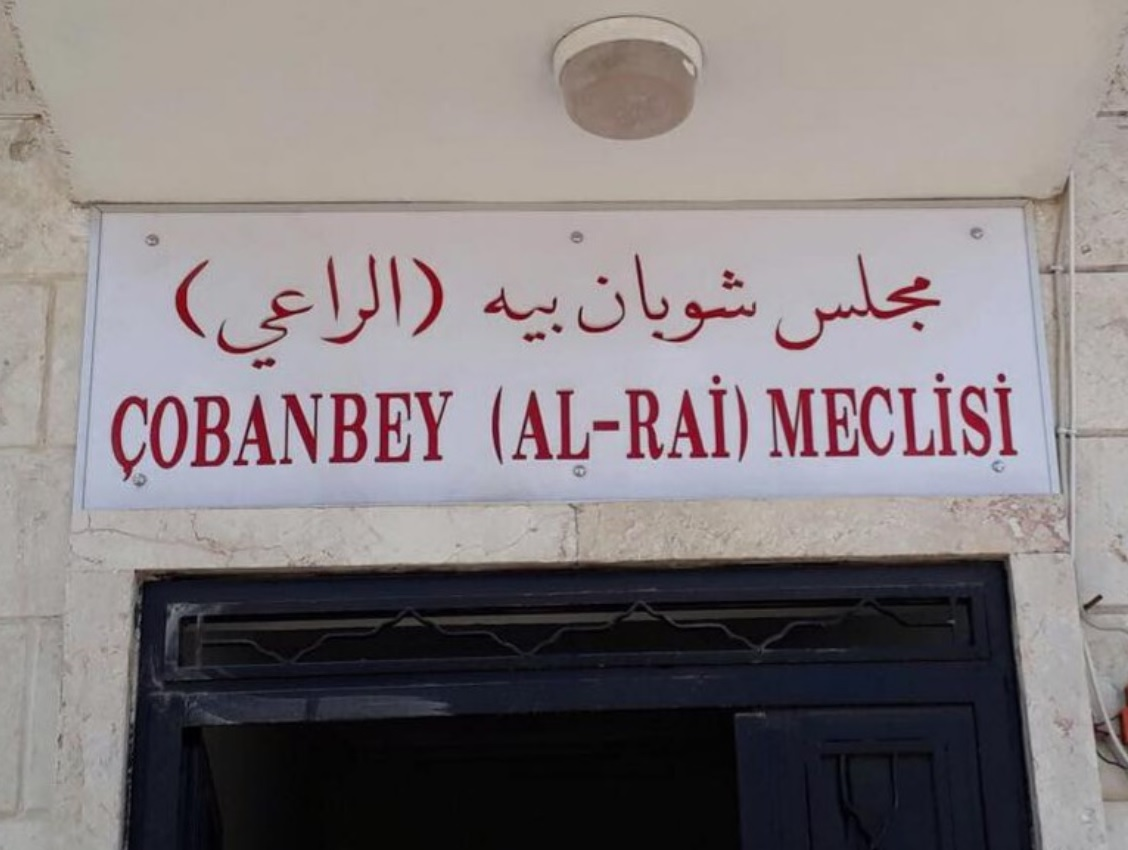
The Al-Rai Council in Syria
