= 2007 Syrian presidential election =

- 27 May 2007
- Turnout: 95.86%
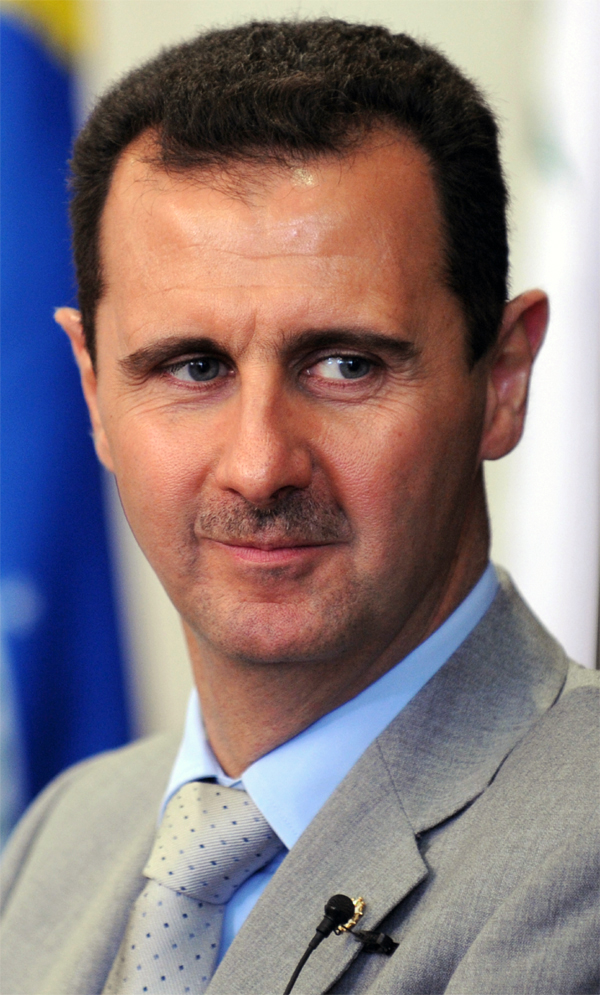
Nominee	Bashar al-Assad
Party	Ba'ath Party
Alliance	NPF
Popular vote	11,199,445
Percentage	99.82%
- Results by constituent state Assad: 90–100% Election not held
President before election
Bashar al-Assad
Ba'ath Party
Elected President
Bashar al-Assad
Ba'ath Party

A referendum to confirm the presidential candidate Bashar al-Assad was held in Syria on 27 May 2007, after the People's Assembly unanimously voted to propose the incumbent for a second term on 10 May 2007.

== Electoral system ==
According to the Syrian Constitution, the Arab Socialist Ba'ath Party of Syria is the leader of the state and society and thus, the President should be a member of the party. The National Progressive Front, a political coalition led by the Ba'ath Party, nominated a candidate in the People's Council. The candidate had to be approved by at least two-thirds of MPs to proceed to the referendum, in which a candidate had to receive at least 51% of the vote.

== Conduct ==
The referendum was widely regarded as a formality, and was boycotted by the opposition. Political opposition groups were banned unless they were attached to the Ba'ath Party, meaning Assad was the only candidate allowed to run. It was reported that dissent was met with imprisonment and intimidation. Fear of government reprisal was said to have been pervasive. Critics accused Assad of rampant corruption, mass arrests against dissidents, and suppression of pro-democracy activists.

Members of the Damascus Declaration issued a statement which said calls to amend the constitution to allow for freer elections were ignored. Syrian lawyer Haitham al-Maleh stated "there is only one candidate and this is absolutely not a healthy process." Tom Casey, American spokesman for the State Department, said "I'm sure President Assad is basking in the glow of his ability to have defeated exactly zero other candidates and continue his misrule of Syria," and that "clearly there was no real choice here for the Syrian people."

== Results ==
Candidate	Party	Votes	%
Bashar al-Assad	Ba'ath Party	11,199,445	99.82
Against		19,653	0.18
Total		11,219,098	100.00
Valid votes		11,219,098	97.79
Invalid/blank votes		253,059	2.21
Total votes		11,472,157	100.00
Registered voters/turnout		11,967,611	95.86
Source: IFES

== Aftermath ==
Interior Minister Bassam Abdel Majeed claimed "this great consensus shows the political maturity of Syria and the brilliance of our democracy", while the ministry described voter turnout as "enormous". The information minister, Muhsen Bilal, stated that "we have our own style of democracy and we are proud of it."
