= Killing of Hamza Ali al-Khateeb =

Boy killed in 2011 while detained by the Syrian Government

Hamza al-Khateeb
- حمزة الخطيب
- Born: 24 October 1997; Al-Jiza, Daraa Governorate, Syria
- Died: 25 May 2011 (aged 13); Daraa, Syria
- Cause of death: Torture

Hamza Ali al-Khateeb (Arabic: حَمْزَة عَلِيّ الْخَطِيب; 24 October 1997 – 25 May 2011) was a 13-year-old Syrian boy who died while in the custody of the Ba'athist Syrian government in Daraa.

On 29 April 2011, he was detained during a protest. On 25 May 2011, his lifeless body was delivered to his family, having been badly bruised and mutilated. Hamza's family distributed photos and video of the body to journalists and activists. Shocked by what was depicted, thousands of people showed their support for Hamza online and in street protests. His death galvanized the nascent Syrian revolution.

== Background ==
Hamza lived with his parents in the village of Al-Jiza in the Daraa Governorate, southern Syria. He enjoyed watching his homing pigeons fly above his house since drought had left him unable to enjoy swimming. He had a reputation for being generous. "He would often ask his parents for money to give to the poor. I remember once he wanted to give someone 100 Syrian pounds ($2), and his family said it was too much. But Hamza said 'I have a bed and food while that guy has nothing'. And so he persuaded his parents to give the poor man the 100," his cousin told Al Jazeera.

Hamza had an older brother, Omar, who was arrested in 2018 for refusing conscription. Another relative, Yunus, was also detained. Documents released from Sednaya Prison after the fall of the Assad regime in 2024 confirmed that both Omar and Yunus had also died in police custody. Hamza's father died in 2024. His younger brother, Suraqa, and his mother survived to see the fall of the Assad regime.

== Detention, torture, and death ==
Al Jazeera reported that Hamza was not interested in politics, according to an unnamed cousin, but on 29 April 2011, he joined his family in a rally to break the siege of the city of Daraa. "Everybody seemed to be going to the protest, so he went along as well," his cousin said. Hamza walked with friends and family 12 kilometres (7.5 mi) along the road from al-Jiza northwest to Saida. Firing began as the protesters reached Saida. Hamza's cousin said, "People were killed and wounded, some were arrested. It was chaotic we didn't know at that point what had happened to Hamza. He just disappeared." One source said Hamza had been among 51 protesters detained by the Air Force Intelligence, which detainees reportedly described as having a reputation for torture.

A still image from the video Hamza's relatives made chronicling his various wounds, following the return of his body to them by the Syrian government, one month after Hamza was detained

The Syrian government returned Hamza's body to his parents on 21 May 2011. A video of his body filmed several days after his death showed numerous injuries, including broken bones, gunshot wounds, burn marks, and mutilated genitals. The Globe and Mail summarized: "His jaw and both kneecaps had been smashed. His flesh was covered with cigarette burns. His penis had been cut off. Other injuries appeared to be consistent with the use of electroshock devices and being whipped with a cable." After cutting off his penis, Hamza's torturers forced him to continuously drink water so that he would have to frequently urinate.

Following Al Jazeera's broadcast of a video showing Hamza's body, there was widespread outrage, both online and among the protesters in Syria.

In response to Al Jazeera's story, the chief of the Syrian regime's medical examiners association denied that Hamza was tortured.

Hamza was buried in Daraa. His grave was damaged during the Syrian civil war.

== Backlash and impact ==
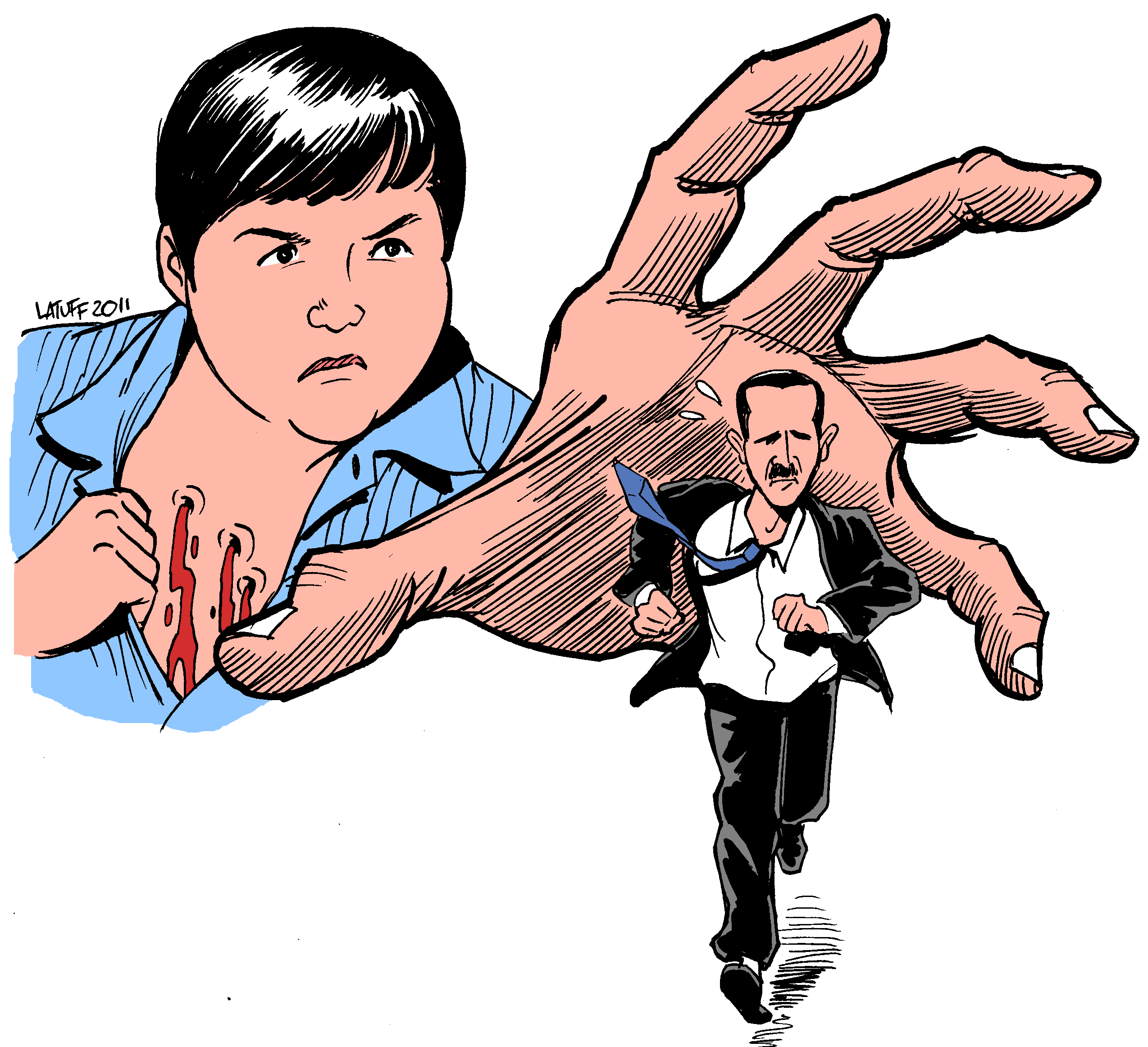
Hamza Ali al-Khateeb hunting Bashar al-Assad by Carlos Latuff.

Hamza's name became a rallying cry for protesters. A Facebook page honoring him had reached more than 100,000 followers by June 2011. Following the pattern of demonstrators calling Fridays a "day of rage," Saturdays in Syria were called the "day of Hamza."

On 31 May 2011, U.S. Secretary of State Hillary Clinton marked his death as a turning point in the Syrian uprising, saying it symbolized "the total collapse of any effort by the Syrian government's to work with and listen to their own people."

On 14 March 2012, The Guardian released 3,000 emails leaked from Asma al-Assad, Bashar al-Assad's wife, and her father, Fawaz Akhras. Akhras had emailed Bashar al-Assad, instructing him to respond to allegations that children were tortured in Syria by dismissing it as "British propaganda." Doctors hired by the Syrian government performed an autopsy and concluded his wounds were not compatible with torture, but many doubt the veracity of these findings, nor changed public opinion on the matter.

== Legacy ==
Hamza remained a prominent symbol in the chants and collective memory of the Syrian revolution throughout the years of the uprising.

Following the fall of the Assad regime in December 2024, the newly appointed Syrian President Ahmed al-Sharaa referenced Hamza in his inaugural speech, describing the revolution's victory over the Assad regime as one that came in part "from the fingertips of Hamza al-Khateeb."

On 31 January 2025, Syrian security forces arrested Atef Najib, cousin of Bashar al-Assad and the former head of the Political Security Directorate in Daraa Governorate, the branch responsible for detaining Hamza. The arrest was widely regarded as a symbolic act of justice and a moment of closure for the memory of Hamza.

On 3 July 2025, during a national event unveiling Syria's new visual identity, drone formations above the Tomb of the Unknown Soldier in Damascus depicted key symbols from the Syrian revolution. Among the aerial illustrations projected in the night sky was the image of Hamza.

== See also ==
- Death of Khaled Mohamed Saeed
- Death of Ali Jawad al-Sheikh
- Death of Ali Abdulhadi Mushaima
- Death of Ahmed Jaber al-Qattan
- Death of Alan Kurdi
- Mohamed Bouazizi

=== General ===
- List of kidnappings
- List of solved missing person cases (post-2000)
