= Mouawiya Syasneh =

Syrian protester

- معاوية الصياصنة
- Born: 1996 (age 29–30) or 1997 (age 28–29); Daraa, Syria
- Organization: Free Syrian Army
- Known for: Role in the Syrian civil war

Mouawiya Syasneh (Arabic: معاوية الصياصنة; born 1996 or 1997) is a Syrian protester and soldier. In March 2011, then 14 or 15-year-old Syasneh and his friends spray-painted anti-government graffiti on the walls of their school in Daraa, leading to their arrest. Many credited the graffiti incident as a trigger for the onset of widespread protests against the regime of President Bashar al-Assad, which ultimately escalated into the Syrian civil war.

== Early life ==
Mouawiya Syasneh was born to a conservative Sunni Muslim family in the southern city of Daraa, which was later considered the "cradle of the Syrian revolution". Syasneh described his challenges under Assad's authoritarian rule, with the arrival of security chief Atef Najib worsening conditions and intensifying public dissatisfaction due to increasing atrocities committed before and during the Siege of Daraa by the Syrian Arab Army, where accusations arose of torture and extrajudicial killings of dissidents. In particular, the Syrian Arab Army detained and tortured dissidents accused of making graffiti against the Assad government.

== Role in the Syrian Civil War ==
In February 2011, inspired by the Arab Spring protests in Egypt and Tunisia, Syasneh and his friends spray-painted the words "Ejak el door, ya doctor" ("Your turn has come, O Doctor"), referring to Assad, who had trained as an ophthalmologist before becoming Syria's leader. They were detained for 26 days by the Syrian secret police, the Mukhabarat, where they were reportedly tortured and mistreated. "The electric shock treatment was the worst," Syasneh recounted, adding, "They took me to the bathroom, and it was really wet, and they would turn on the shower. They ran the current through the water and onto my back. I felt the shock wherever the water went." Thousands of people took to the streets demanding their release. When the government violently suppressed these demonstrations, the unrest spread nationwide, marking the beginning of the Syrian civil war. The graffiti incident is considered one of the early sparks of the Syrian uprising. While Syasneh did not intend to initiate a nationwide movement, the event coincided with growing discontent toward Bashar al-Assad’s government. Protests in Daraa escalated, contributing to broader unrest that later developed into an armed conflict.

In 2013, his father, a retired architectural engineer, was killed by a mortar while on his way to the mosque. Following this, Syasneh joined the Free Syrian Army (FSA) and participated in several battles against government forces, stating, "I never thought about shooting anyone before that, but he was my whole life, and I wanted to fight for him." As of 2017, Syasneh continued to live in Daraa in his partially damaged childhood home with his widowed mother and siblings. Syasneh visited Damascus immediately after the fall of the Assad regime.
