= Maher al-Assad =

Syrian fugitive and former general and commander of the 4th Division

- مَاهِرُ ٱلْأَسَد
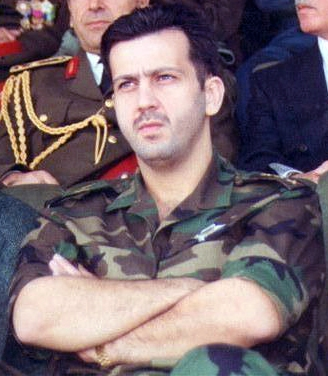
- Assad in 2008
- Born: 8 December 1967 (age 58); Damascus, Syria
- Political party: Ba'ath Party (until 2024)
- Other political affiliations: National Progressive Front (until 2025)
- Spouse: Manal al-Jadaan
- Status: Self-imposed exile in Russia; Subject of arrest warrant by the Fourth Criminal Court in Damascus
- Convictions: Crimes against humanity; Murder; Torture
- Penalty: Death (in absentia)
- Capture status: Fugitive
- Wanted since: 2025

Details
- Country: Syria
- Military career
- Relatives: Hafez al-Assad (father) Bushra al-Assad (sister) Bassel al-Assad (brother) Bashar al-Assad (brother) Majd al-Assad (brother) Jamil al-Assad (uncle) Rifaat al-Assad (uncle)
- Allegiance: Ba'athist Syria
- Branch: Syrian Arab Army
- Service years: 1988–2024
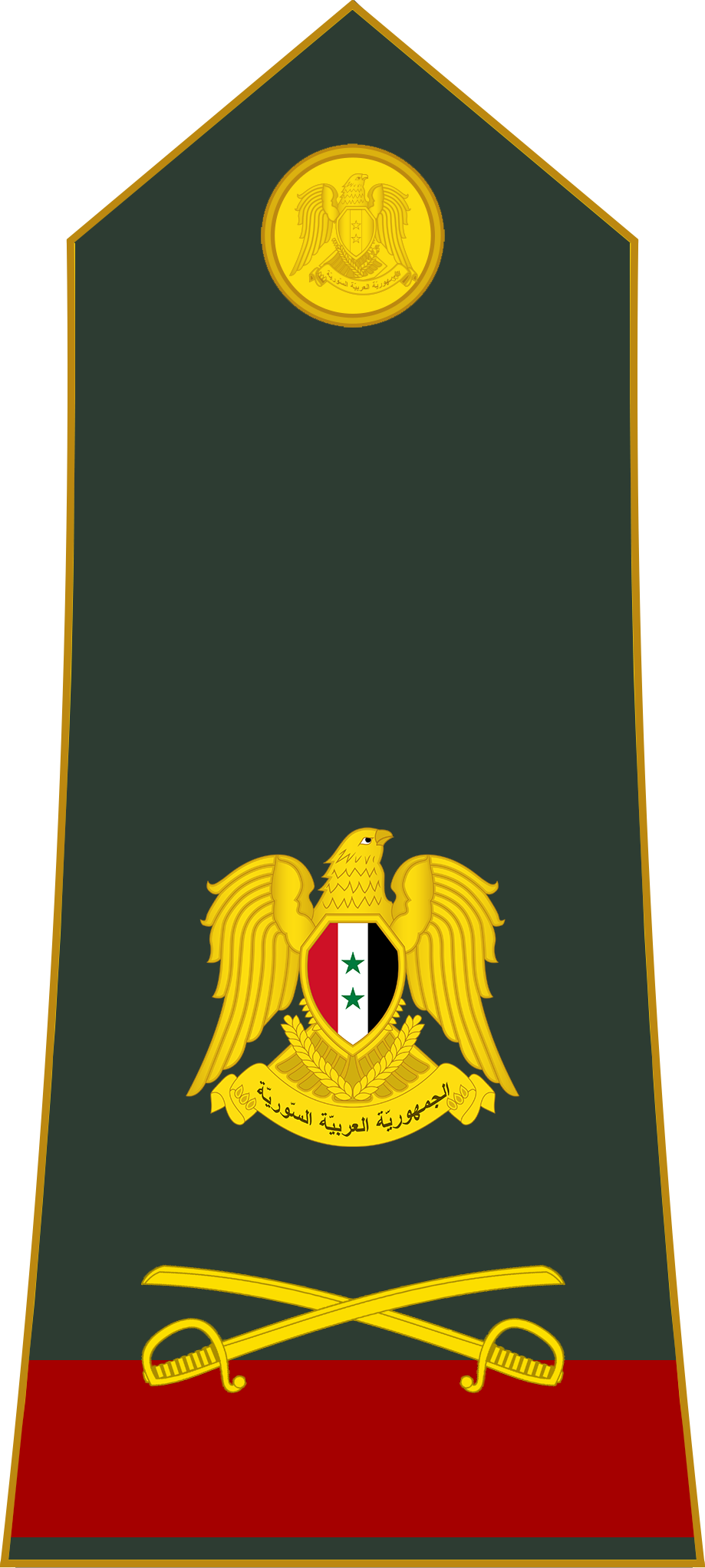
- Rank: Major General
- Nickname: The Chief
- Commands: Republican Guard; 4th Armoured Division
- Conflicts: Syrian Civil War: Siege of Daraa; Rif Dimashq Governorate campaign; Siege of Homs; Battle of Aleppo (2012–2016); Wadi Barada offensive (2016–17)

Major General Maher al-Assad (Arabic: مَاهِرُ ٱلْأَسَدِ, romanized: Māhir al-ʾAsad, born 8 December 1967) is a Syrian war criminal, fugitive, and former military officer who served as commander of the Syrian Army's elite 4th Armoured Division, which, together with Syria's Military Intelligence, formed the core of the Assad regime's security forces until its collapse in 2024. He, along with his brother, former Syrian president Bashar al-Assad, was found guilty in 2026 of war crimes and crimes against humanity by a Syrian court and sentenced to death in absentia.

At the onset of the Syrian Revolution, Maher was thought by some to be the second-most powerful man in Syria after his brother Bashar, the president. Maher is considered a regime hardliner, who reportedly favored the crackdown against the Damascus Spring movement and has been implicated in UN reports of orchestrating the killing of Lebanese Prime Minister Rafic Hariri.

Maher oversaw the crackdown against Syrian protestors at Daraa, which led to the US and the European Union announcing sanctions against him. Maher is described by analysts as preferring Iran (as opposed to Russia) to play the largest role as the Syrian government's main ally during the Syrian civil war and subsequent post-war reconstruction. This is in contrast to the position of Major General Suheil al-Hassan, commander of the 25th Special Mission Forces Division who had gained much influence as a result of his activities during the Syrian Civil War, who was reported as preferring Russia. However, it was reported in 2021 that Maher was part of the Ba'athist faction that demanded the end of Iranian presence in Syria, so as to promote regional rapprochement with neighboring Arab countries.

Maher al-Assad also supervised operations of the Shabiha squads, pro-Assad Alawite paramilitaries known for sectarian attacks against Sunni civilians. As the commander of Fourth Armoured Division, Maher was likely involved in the production, trafficking and export operations of Syria's multi-billion dollar drug empire, which mostly smuggles an illegal drug known as Captagon. (Note: Sources:)

On December 8, 2024, during the Syrian opposition offensive, Maher, along with his brother Bashar and his nephew Hafez, left Damascus, moving to Latakia, and from there evacuated to Moscow.

== Early life and education ==
Maher al-Assad was born on 8 December 1967, the youngest child of Anisa Makhlouf and Hafez al-Assad. He was just two years old when his father became President of Syria. Like the other children in the Assad family, he was raised out of the public spotlight and trained in Syria.

Maher went to the Academy of Freedom School for his secondary education and then studied business administration at Damascus University. Following university, he pursued a career in the military like his older brother Bassel.

After Bassel died in a car crash in 1994, Maher was mentioned as a possible successor to Hafez, but in the end, Bashar succeeded his father even though he lacked both military experience and political ambition. It was speculated that Maher's hot-tempered reputation influenced his father's decision in favour of Bashar.

== Business activities ==
Maher al-Assad operated a number of different business projects in Lebanon with his cousin Rami Makhlouf. Shmuel Bar argues that there was a split between the two of them, because the Makhloufs were worried that they were going to be made the scapegoats of an anti-corruption propaganda campaign. Maher for a while controlled online media site Cham Press.

=== Money laundering ===
On 23 May 2011, the EU placed sanctions for providing funding to the government which allowed violence against demonstrators during the Syrian civil war. According to Fortune Magazine, Maher benefited from the billion-dollar money laundering operation at the Lebanese al-Madina bank which collapsed in 2003 at the start of the Iraq War. Al Madina was used to launder kickback money of Iraqi officials and their partners in the illegal gaming of the UN's oil-for-food programme. Sources put the amount transferred and laundered through al-Madina at more than $1 billion, with a 25 percent commission going to Syrian officials and their Lebanese allies; among the recipients of this money was Bashar Assad's brother Maher.

Al Madina bank records indicate that Maher's office manager, Khalid Qaddur, was transferred at no cost a Beirut apartment valued at $2.5 million, a transfer that investigators believe was intended to put it under Maher's control. The entire file on the Madina bank collapse is at the Lebanese Ministry of Justice, except for key parts that implicate Maher, which are still at the Lebanese Central Bank because people fear being killed over it. On 23 June 2011, the EU placed sanctions on Maher's office manager, Khalid Qaddur, for providing funding to the government which allowed violence against demonstrators during the Syrian uprising. Similar sanctions were also placed on Ra'if al-Quwatli, another business associate of Maher.

== Military career ==
After Bassel's death in 1994, Maher assumed command of a brigade in the Republican Guard. His time as brigade commander allowed him to gain valuable military experience and build personal ties with his officers. After the death of his father in 2000, he was promoted from major to lieutenant-colonel. Maher subsequently became commander of the Republican Guard, a 10,000 strong unit whose loyalty was said to be guaranteed by the significant share of revenue that it received from the oil fields in the Deir ez-Zor region, and the commander of the army's elite 4th Armoured Division which was once his uncle Rifaat Assad's Defense companies.

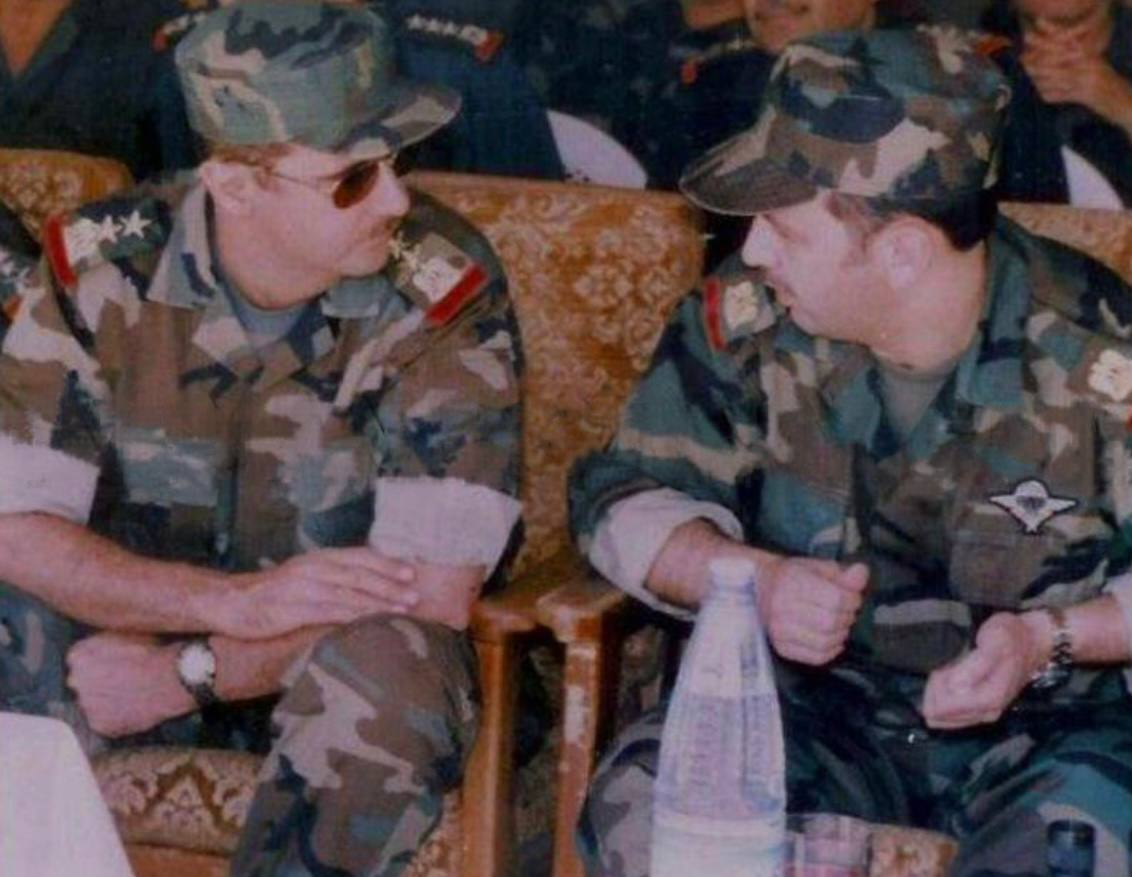
Maher (right) with his brother, Bashar, 1999

In June 2000, Maher was elected to the Central Committee of the Ba'ath Party's Syrian Regional Branch and subsequently was influential in persuading his brother Bashar during the first few months of his rule to put an end to the political openness of the short lived Damascus Spring. Three years later Maher Assad met in Jordan with Israeli businessman Eitan Bentzur, a former director-general of the Israeli Foreign Ministry, and offered to reopen peace negotiations with Israel without preconditions. The offer was rejected by Ariel Sharon, the Prime Minister of Israel.

Maher often appeared in public with Bashar and is said to be one of his closest advisers. He competed with Assef Shawkat, who was married to his sister Bushra al-Assad and was head of military intelligence, for influence in the Assad government. Maher was opposed to Shawkat's marriage to his sister Bushra, and had Shawkat imprisoned on several occasions to keep them apart. In October 1999, he was rumoured to have shot Shawkat in the stomach during an argument. Assef survived, and the two were said to have good relations then. Bashar, Maher, and Assef were said to form the inner circle of power in the Assad government.

Both Shawkat and Maher al-Assad were mentioned in a leaked draft version of the Mehlis report as suspects in the 2005 murder of former Lebanese Prime Minister Rafik Hariri. According to the draft version, "one witness of Syrian origin but resident in Lebanon, who claims to have worked for the Syrian intelligence services in Lebanon, stated that approximately two weeks after the adoption of Security Council resolution 1559, Maher Al Assad, Assef Shawkat, Hassan Khalil, Bahjat Suleyman and Jamil Al Sayyed decided to assassinate Rafik Hariri."

In 2008, Maher was in charge of putting down a prison revolt in Sednaya Prison, where 400 soldiers had been kidnapped by the prisoners. Around 25 people out of 10,000 inmates were killed during the crackdown. Human rights groups had unverified video footage that purportedly shows Maher taking photographs with his mobile phone of the dismembered bodies of prisoners after the riot. Maher's sister-in-law, Majd al-Jadaan, who lives in exile in Washington DC, claims that the individual in the video footage is Maher. In 2016 and 2017, there were conflicting reporting regarding Maher's rank, whether he was a brigadier general or major general.

In April 2018, he was made the head of Syria's elite 4th Armoured Division, which oversaw, amongst other things, the activities of the armed Alawite militia known as the Shabiha. He had previously been the commander of the 42nd battalion within the division.

== Syrian civil war ==
Since the beginning of the Syrian uprising in mid-March 2011, Maher's troops played a key role in violently suppressing protests in the southern city of Daraa, the coastal city of Banias, the central province of Homs and the northern province of Idlib. The Los Angeles Times reported that video footage existed, which activists and observers claimed showing Maher personally shooting at unarmed protesters, who were demanding the fall of the Assad government in the Barzeh suburb of Damascus. Defecting soldiers under Maher's command reported they were given orders by him to use deadly force against unarmed protesters. One defecting sniper reported that during the protests in Deraa: "We were ordered to aim for the head or heart from the beginning. We were not given specific numbers but told to kill as many as possible as long as there were protests."

Prime Minister of Turkey, Recep Tayyip Erdogan, stated that Maher's actions during the Syrian uprising approached "savagery", and he pressured Bashar al-Assad to remove Maher from command of the military and to send him into exile. The United States on 27 April 2011 placed sanctions on Maher for being a facilitator of human rights violations in Syria. Two weeks later, on 10 May 2011, the EU sanctioned Maher for being the principal overseer of violence against demonstrators during the Syrian uprising. The Arab League issued a list of nineteen Syrian officials banned from travelling to Arab countries and whose assets were being frozen by those countries. Among those named were Assad's brother, Maher al-Assad, his cousin and telecom magnate Rami Makhlouf, as well as military and intelligence figures.

On 2 December 2011, Maher was also placed on an international travel ban.

Maher al-Assad's role became more significant following the assassination of the Syrian defense minister, high-ranking security officials and Assef Shawkat on 18 July 2012. After a four-day siege by the opposition forces from 18 to 22 July 2012, the 4th Armoured Division, commanded by Maher, swept through three rebel-held districts of Damascus.

In August 2012, Saudi newspaper Al-Watan claimed that Assad was willing to step down and that his brother Maher had lost his legs in the 18 July 2012 Damascus bombing, allegedly quoting the Russian deputy foreign minister Mikhail Bogdanov. The information was immediately denied in Russian media. The daily then released an audio of the claimed conversation, but the voice reportedly did not sound like Bogdanov's. Other sources, including a Western diplomat, said they had heard Maher lost a leg.

A July 2013 report by a pro-government website stated that Maher was commanding troops in the Aleppo and Homs theatre of operations.

On September 30, 2024, the Israeli Defense Forces launched an airstrike with high-explosive missiles on Maher's villa in a Damascus suburb. It was reported that members of Hezbollah and the Islamic Revolutionary Guard Corps frequently visited the villa. It was soon reported that Maher was unharmed because he was not in the villa at the time of the attack.

On November 30, a new rebel coalition, spearheaded by the militant group Hayat Tahrir al-Sham (HTS), carried out a surprise attack across Syria over 11 days, sweeping through major cities to conquer Syria and overthrow the Assad regime. This significant development faced minimal resistance from the Syrian army.

On December 8, 2024, during the Syrian opposition offensive, Maher Assad, along with his brother Bashar Assad and his sons, left Damascus, moving to Latakia, and from there evacuated to Moscow.

== Controversies ==
As commander of both the elite Republican Guard and Fourth Armoured Division, Maher is reputed as the most "thuggish" and ruthless person within the Assad family. He is widely perceived as a hardline loyalist who finishes the "dirty work" for the regime. Dominic Waghorn of Sky News described him as the “psychotic, deranged brother who has personally overseen much of the regime's reign of terror”.

A 2005 UN report accused Maher of being personally involved in the assassination of Lebanese Prime Minister Rafic Hariri. Maher's infamous Fourth Armoured Division was responsible for launching brutal crackdowns on the protestors of Daraa, killing many civilians, which led to the spread of anti-government demonstrations across the country during the events of the Syrian Revolution.

=== Involvement in drug trade ===
Maher plays the central role in coordinating Syrian regime's production of illegal drugs and its trafficking to foreign countries. Syria has the World’s largest captagon production. According to Jordanian journalist Salah Malkawi:

Commanders of militias, security agencies, military forces are involved in the drug smuggling operation. The drugs cannot reach these areas without passing through dozens of barriers and checkpoints that fall under the Fourth Division, which is under the leadership of Maher al-Assad, the brother of the Syrian president... I’ve spoken to several (smugglers). They have received military training … using war tactics … to carry out sophisticated raids.

=== Sanctions ===
In April 2011, United States President Barack Obama issued Executive Order 13572 blocking property of Maher al-Assad with respect to human rights abuses and brutal crackdown on protestors in Syria.

In March 2023, United States and United Kingdom issued further sanctions against Maher al-Assad and his associates, alongside other drug barons, for their involvement in Syria's narcotics industry and trafficking of Captagon. US Department of Treasury accused Maher al-Assad and his Fourth Division for financing "illicit revenue-generation schemes, which range from smuggling cigarettes and mobile phones to facilitating the production and trafficking of Captagon".

In April 2023, European Union imposed sanctions on individuals and firms associated with Maher and his Fourth Armoured Division for its war crimes, torture and facilitation of Syria's illicit drug trade. The Assad regime was designated as the main actor that facilitated the trafficking of Captagon to European ports. The sanctions document published by Council of the European Union stated:

The Fourth Armoured Division is responsible for the violent repression of the civilian population. The Fourth Armoured Division also profits form the war economy, especially the trafficking in Captagon. Captagon trade has become a regime-led business model, enriching the inner circle of the regime and forming its lifeline.

=== Rumoured death ===
On 20 August 2012, rumours surfaced that Maher, who had not been seen since 18 July 2012 Damascus bombing, succumbed to his injuries after RT reported that a senior Syrian military official died in a hospital in Moscow. After the report was released, Syrian state media denied it was true. A member of the pro-opposition Syrian National Council, Mohammad Mahzeh, claimed he and other members were 100% certain it was true, and Maher was the Syrian military official who died in Moscow.

However, on 10 October 2012, Abdullah Omar, a defected Syrian journalist, told CNN that Maher was treated in Russia but returned to the presidential palace, where al-Omar said that Maher had lost his left leg in the bombing and also the use of his left arm.

A photo of Maher Al-Assad with singer George Wassouf from June 2014 was published by a Lebanese TV presenter, confirming that he is alive.

=== International arrest warrant ===
On 15 November 2023, France issued an arrest warrant for Maher al-Assad on charges of complicity in crimes against humanity and complicity in war crimes. The charges are related to chemical attacks in the town of Douma and the district of Eastern Ghouta in August 2013 which killed more than 1,000 people. More warrants were issued in September 2025 by the French government for the deaths of journalists Marie Colvin and Rémi Ochlik.

=== Death sentence in absentia ===
On 11 August 2026, a Syrian court sentenced Maher al-Assad and his brother, Bashar al-Assad, to death in absentia as part of a ruling against several former regime officials.

== Personal life ==
The Assad family is affiliated with the Alawite syncretic Muslim sect which splintered off from early Shi'ism. Maher is married to Manal al-Jadaan, a Sunni woman with whom he has two daughters and one son. His marriage to a Sunni woman, like his brother Bashar, strengthened his business connections with the Sunni elite.

Maher Asad has a wife and her name is Manal Al Jadaan, she was born on February 2, 1970

According to the GlobalPost, Maher is considered by those who know him to be too hot-tempered to be an effective ruler. In addition, The GlobalPost said that Maher caused his sister-in-law, Majd al-Jadaan, to leave Syria in August 2008 due to ongoing disagreements.
