= Your turn has come, O Doctor =

Anti-Assadist slogan

Your turn has come, O Doctor (Arabic: أجاك الدور يا دكتور, romanized: Ajāk al-Dawr yā Duktūr), also translated to as Your turn next, Doctor or simply Your turn, Doctor, is an Arabic slogan that was graffitied by Mouawiya Syasneh in February 2011 in response to the Arab Spring and the Assad regime's rule.

== Graffiti ==
Syasneh heard news about Egypt and Tunisia during the Arab spring with the Tunisian and Egyptian revolution. Wanting the same for Syria against Bashar al-Assad, Syasneh and his acquaintances bought spray canisters and vandalized a wall with the words Your turn has come, O Doctor after a school day in Daraa. The term "doctor" that is used for Bashar al-Assad is in reference to him becoming an ophthalmologist in London after studying at the Damascus University. The graffiti was also inspired by other graffiti made in December 2003 after the capture of Saddam Hussein during the 2003 invasion of Iraq.

=== Aftermath ===
After people started noticing the graffiti on the wall, it was alerted to the local police chief and Mukhabarat of Daraa, Atef Najib, where they then investigated who vandalized the wall. Due to the fact that no one took responsibility, they arrested people whose names were written on the wall years earlier and everyone who was under the age of 20 years old. 15 teenagers that were arrested were held in the custody of the police force, where they were tortured for weeks and went through beatings and fingernail removal. Parents of the teenagers that were being held requested that their children be released; they were told "Forget your children. If you want children, make more children. If you don’t know how, bring us your women and we will make them for you". Many parents and other civilians in Daraa protested for their release in the streets, but a lot of times were forced to disperse by the police shooting tear gas and bullets at protestors. After 26 days of the teenagers being held, they were released due to the backlash and no evidence of wrongdoing.

As the protests continued due to the arrests, people graffitied other phrases and tell-tale slogans on walls in Daraa, which prompted Syrian police to arrest every graffiti artist known in the region of Daraa. One of these protests was at the 8th century-old mosque, the Al-Omari Mosque in Bosra, which was set up as a makeshift medical clinic for those affected by gunfire or tear gas, but at 2 AM on March 23, 2011, Syrian security forces stormed the mosque and killed 15 protestors after shutting down the city. They severed all landline and cellular phone connections in order to stop the spreading of information, but the government later released a press statement where they blamed "armed gangs" in relation to weapons and militant stockpiling in the mosque. The state-owned television in Syria broadcast pictures of a so-called cache of weapons found in the mosque and claimed that the armed gang used kidnapped children as human shields, stating that armed Islamists took over protests, shifting blame from the Syrian government to Sunni Muslims.

=== Other variations ===
In response to the early Syrian uprising, another slogan was created by pro-Assad militants, Syrian state-funded Shabiha, that stated "Assad or we burn the country", which was graffitied on walls in a similar fashion to the slogan created by Syasneh.

During other protests in February, the slogan ash-shab yurid isqat an-nizam (the people want to topple the regime) began being graffitied onto walls along with the phrase "your turn, doctor" in Arabic.

== See also ==
- Syrian revolution
