= Capital punishment in Syria =

The Syrian Penal Code No. 148 of 1949 and various later acts specify for what crimes capital punishment in Syria can be imposed. However, the Assad family ruled the country as dictators from 1970 until 2024 and suborned the legal code to kill their opponents.

== Capital crimes ==
The 1949 penal code divides capital crimes into two categories: threats to state security and certain serious crimes. The former consists of:

- Bearing arms in enemy ranks (Article 263/1)
- Collaborating with a foreign state to incite it to attack Syria, if the attack occurs (article 264/1)
- Communicating with or providing assistance to the enemy by any means (article 265)
- Weakening national defense during wartime or in anticipation of war, if it leads to human casualties (article 266)
- Inciting civil war or sectarian conflict that results in bloodshed (article 298)
- Participating in a conspiracy that results in partial or complete destruction of public institutions, disruption of communication or transportation networks, or the death of a person (article 305)

Crimes are:

- Forming a criminal gang if its members commit murder or subject victims to brutal torture (article

326)

- Premeditated murder in specific circumstances, such as killing to conceal or facilitate another crime, or murdering an ancestor or descendant (article 535)
- Arson if it results in the death of a person (article 577)

Law No. 61 of 1950, also known as the Military Penal Code, lists capitals crimes involving military service and national security:

- Fleeing to the enemy (article 102)
- Conspiracy to flee abroad during battle (article 103, paragraphs A-B)
- Refusing to execute an attack order during battle (Article 112/E)
- Inciting rebellion in front of the enemy or during war (articles 113/7 and 114/3)
- Assaulting an injured or sick soldier with the intent to strip them of their weapon (Article 132)
- Abandoning a guard post in front of the enemy (article 142)
- Self-inflicted injury to evade military duties during war (article 146/1)
- Surrendering a military post to the enemy without exhausting all means of defense (article 152)
- Espionage and collaboration with the enemy (article 158)
- Recruitment on behalf of the enemy (article 160)

Act No. 2 of 1993 on Narcotics imposes the death sentence for:

- Manufacturing, cultivating, smuggling, or trafficking drugs (article 39)
- Repeating the offense, or when it is committed by a security officer, or using a minor, or operating within an international syndicate
- Committing the crime in sensitive locations such as educational institutions, prisons, places of worship, or military camps (article 40/B)

Act No. 49 of 1980 on Banning the Muslim Brotherhood invokes the death penalty for joining the Muslim Brotherhood.

Act No. 19 of 2012 (Counterterrorism Act) makes the following capital crimes:

- Smuggling, manufacturing, stealing, or possessing weapons and explosives with the intent to use them in a terrorist act, if it results in the death of a person (article 5/2)
- Threatening to commit a terrorist act if it leads to the death of a person (article 6/3)

Legislative Decree No. 20 of 2013 on Criminalizing Abduction stipulates the death penalty in two situations: "The kidnapping results in the death of the victim or causes them a permanent disability." or "The victim is sexually assaulted by the abductor."

Finally, Act No. 39 of 2023 (Forestry Act) imposes the death sentence for "intentionally setting fire to state-owned forests with the intent to harm the national economy, if the act results in the death of a person."

== Procedure ==
Once a regular criminal court has sentenced a defendant to death, it must be reviewed and ratified by the Court of Cassation. If ratified, the ultimate decision the rests with the president of Syria, who can approve or reduce the sentence. A Special Clemency Committee can recommend a reduced sentence, but this is not binding on the president.

== People given the death penalty ==
Later-deposed president Bashar al-Assad used the legal system to terrorize his people and execute his political enemies. In 2017, Amnesty International reported the Syrian government hanged as many as 13,000 people at Sednaya Prison between 2011 and 2015 after Military Field Court trials lasting one to three minutes. In 2021, 24 men were hanged for starting wildfires that led to deaths and devastation.

On 11 August 2026, a Syrian court sentenced Bashar al-Assad and his brother Maher al-Assad to death in absentia, as part of a ruling against several former regime officials. These sentences were also passed down to multiple former public officials, such as Atef Najib, Fahd Jassem al-Freij, and Mohamed Ayman Ayoush. In total, nine people received death sentences.

After al-Assad was deposed in 2024, two of his supporters were sentenced to death in October 2026 for fomenting a 2025 uprising.
