= Siege of Talkalakh (May 2011) =

Siege

Coordinates: 34.6773°N 36.2504°E

- Part of the Syrian revolution and the Syrian civil war
- Location: Talkalakh, Syria
- Target: Opposition protestors
- Objective: Suppress protests
- Date: 14–19 May 2011 (5 days)
- Executed by: (Syria) Syrian Army: 7,000 – 8,000 troops; 74 tanks and APCs
- Outcome: Protests suppressed
- Casualties: 27 – 45 killed 3,500 refugees

On 14 May 2011, during the Syrian revolution, the Syrian military began an operation in the Syrian town of Talkalakh. The government said that it was targeting terrorist groups, while the Syrian opposition described it as a crackdown against pro-democracy protesters.

== The operation ==
On 15 May, the Syrian military entered the town of Talkalakh, on the border with Lebanon. Reports subsequently emerged that the military was massacring members of the Syrian opposition. The reports were mostly from civilians fleeing over the Kabir river into Lebanon to escape the violence.

By 19 May, the military concluded its operation and began withdrawing from Talkalakh.
