= Siege of Baniyas =

Military operation

Coordinates: 35.1822°N 35.9403°E

- Part of the Syrian revolution and the Syrian civil war
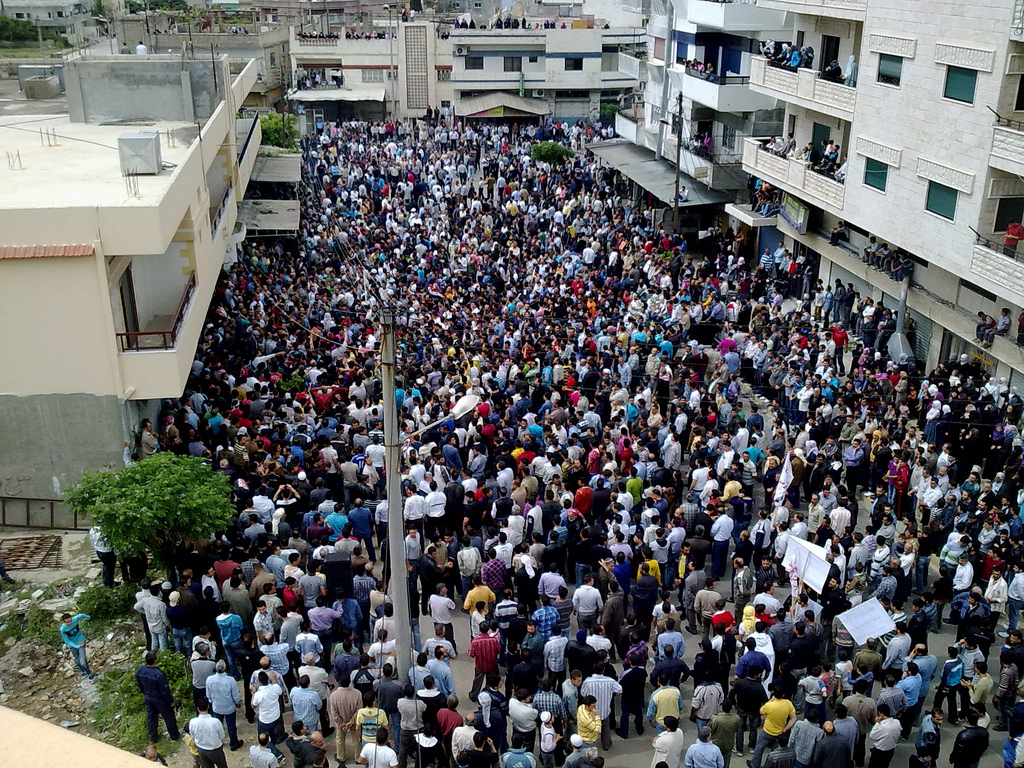
- Location: Baniyas, Syria
- Planned by: Gen. Fo’ad Hamoudeh; Gen. Ramadan Ramadan; Gen. Ghassan Afif
- Objective: Suppress protests
- Date: 7–14 May 2011 (1 week)
- Executed by: (Syria) Syrian Army: Special forces (35th, 45th, 53rd regiment); 4th Armoured Division
- Outcome: Protests suppressed
- Casualties: 10 protestors killed 400 arrested 1-6 soldiers killed

On 7 May 2011, during the Syrian revolution, the Syrian military launched an operation in the Syrian city of Baniyas. The government said it was targeting terrorist groups, while the Syrian opposition called it a crackdown against pro-democracy protesters. The operation lasted until 14 May 2011.

== Prelude ==
On 9 April 2011, unknown gunmen shot at a military bus traveling through Baniyas, killing nine soldiers.

On 10 April, violent clashes erupted between security forces and protesters in Baniyas. Reports indicated that between three and six people were shot dead, while unknown gunmen killed one police officer. The Syrian government's narrative conflicted with that of activists, blaming “armed groups” and demonstrators compared to the activists alleging heavy‑handed repression by security units.

On 14 April, snipers killed a Syrian Army soldier in the city, according to state media.

== Main operation ==
On 7 May, preceded by the successful operation against protestors in Daraa days prior, Syrian Army units entered Baniyas from three directions. They advanced into Sunni districts of the multi-ethnic town. Witnesses and activists reported the sound of heavy gunfire accompanying the advance, tanks blocking major streets, and residents forming human chains in attempts to slow the military’s progress. Syrian naval boats were also seen patrolling off the Mediterranean coastline.

The next day, 8 May, around 30 tanks were seen patrolling the city, with some of them positioned in the city center. Syrian Navy boats were also reportedly holding positions near the city's coastline. Special forces units allegedly entered the northern part of the city, from where heavy gunfire was heard.

On 14 May, the military began to withdraw from the city, effectively ending the siege.
