= Siege of Hama (2011) =

Military operation

- Part of the Syrian revolution and the Syrian civil war
- A map of Syria with Hama Governorate (مُحافظة حماه) highlighted.
- Location: Hama, Syria
- Target: Opposition protesters
- Objective: Suppress protests
- Date: 3 July – 4 August 2011 (1 month and 1 day)
- Executed by: Ba'athist Syria; Syrian Army
- Outcome: Protests suppressed
- Casualties: 16 civilians killed in early July 2011; 200 civilians killed during Ramadan offensive Total: 216+ killed

The 2011 siege of Hama was among the many nationwide crackdowns by the Syrian government during the Syrian revolution, the early stage of the Syrian civil war. Anti-government protests had been ongoing in the Syrian city of Hama since 15 March 2011, when large protests were first reported in the city, similar to the protests elsewhere in Syria. The events beginning in July 2011 were described by anti-government activists in the city as a "siege" or "blockade".

On 1 July, with more than 400,000 protestors, Hama witnessed the largest demonstration against President Bashar al-Assad. Two days later, government tanks were deployed at Hama, in an operation that led to more than 16 civilian deaths at the hands of Syrian security forces.

On 31 July, the Syrian government deployed the Syrian Army into Hama to control protests on the eve of Ramadan, as part of a nationwide crackdown, nicknamed the "Ramadan Massacre." At least 142 people across Syria died on that day, including over 100 in Hama alone, and 29 in Deir ez-Zor. Hundreds more were wounded. By 4 August, more than 200 civilians had been killed in Hama.

== Background ==
=== Early history ===
Historically, Hama had been the epicenter of anti-Ba'athist government since the 1963 Ba'athist coup. As early as 1964, a wide scale riot—often described as an uprising—broke out in the city and was violently suppressed by the military, resulting in more than 70 citizens killed. Violence occurred once again during the 1976–1982 Islamic uprising in Syria, when hundreds of Hama citizens were executed in the April 1981 crackdown. In February 1982, a much larger scale massacre took place in Hama following an armed and organized uprising of Islamic groups occurred, centered in the city. The 1982 massacre claimed the lives of some 10,000 - 25,000 Hama citizens and Islamic militants and as many as 1,000 Syrian Army personnel.

=== Prelude ===
On 3 June 2011, major demonstrations in Hama began, primarily in the city center, and on occasion in the suburbs. Syrian security forces, including military and police, shot dead up to 25 people when they dispersed a demonstration by tens of thousands of locals.

On 1 July 2011, with more than 400,000 protestors, Hama witnessed the largest demonstration against Bashar al-Assad. Soon after, Assad sacked Hama's governor. Two days after, Syrian tanks deployed at Hama in an operation that led to more than 20 civilians being killed by the Syrian security forces and two rape cases were witnessed.

== Chronology ==
=== July 2011 ===
Hundreds of thousands of protesters parade the flag of Syria and shout "Ash-shab yurid isqat an-nizam" in the Assi square of Hama on 22 July 2011

As Hama became a stronghold for opposition to the embattled government of President Bashar al-Assad, reports of violence also grew. An armed blockade was imposed on the city on 3 July.

On 6–7 July, while touring some of Syria's conflict zones, the United States ambassador to Syria Robert Ford, visited Hama and declared that he would stay until Friday, to the ire of the Syrian government, which perceived the unauthorized trip as proof of the US inciting violence to "destabilize" the country. JJ Harder, the press attaché of the US embassy in Damascus, later told Al Jazeera: "Our ambassador Robert Ford was in Hama earlier this month, and he saw with his own eyes the violence that they are talking about. There was none. He maybe saw one teenager with a stick at a checkpoint, and the government is going on with these absolute fabrications about armed gangs running the streets of Hama and elsewhere. Hama has shown itself to be a model of peaceful protest. That was why our ambassador chose to go there." The French ambassador to Syria, Éric Chevallier, subsequently joined the US ambassador to express his support to the victims, in what Robert Ford claimed to be "a gesture of solidarity with local protesters".

On 8 July, more than 500,000 Syrians flooded through the city of Hama in what activists claim was the single biggest protest yet against the Assad government. More tanks were deployed around the outskirts of Hama as part of a strengthening blockade following the protests. It is estimated that up to 350,000 of the city's 700,000 population took part in the protests

On 29 July, over 500,000 citizens rallied in the city following Muslim prayers in which a pro-rebel cleric told the congregation "the regime must go". Local support for the government had imploded by 30 July in Homs, Deir ez-Zor and Hama. On the eve of Ramadan, Syria witnessed the bloodiest day in the 139-day uprising.

On 31 July, Rami Abdel Rahman, head of the Britain-based Syrian Observatory for Human Rights (SOHR), said that Syrian security forces launched an offensive at 5:00 am (0200 GMT) on Muadhamiya, north of Hama, then encircled Hama shortly afterwards. In a separate incident on the same day, political prisoners attempted to mutiny in Hama's central prison, to which security forces responded with live ammunition. The immediate death toll of the failed mutiny was not immediately known. The state news agency reported that eight policemen were killed in clashes in Hama.

The government blamed much of the violence on terrorists and militants, which it accused of killing hundreds of security personnel. At least 136 fatalities were confirmed, with over 100 in Hama and 19 in Deir ez-Zor, in addition to hundreds of injuries. The crackdown was the most intense of the Syrian revolution thus far, with over 2,200 protesters dead. One Hama resident, a doctor who did not want to be identified for fear of arrest, told Reuters that Syrian Army tanks were attacking Hama from four different directions and "firing randomly". Another resident said snipers had climbed onto the roofs of the state-owned electricity company and the main prison, and that electricity had been cut in eastern neighbourhoods. Tanks also reportedly fired on mosques while loudspeakers broadcast "Allahu Akbar".

The United Nations Security Council met on the night of 31 July to debate the situation in Syria.

Syrian dissidents claimed that the tank assault on Hama on 31 July, in which 84 people had died, was an attempt to pacify and regain control of the city ahead of Ramadan and to avert protests during the holy month.

=== August 2011 ===
Syrian security forces continued to bombard Hama on 1 August. The British Daily Telegraph reported that "many of Hama's residents ... braved the obvious danger to head to mosques for dawn prayers. As they emerged onto the streets, the shelling resumed. Three worshipers were struck down and killed, while a fourth was shot dead by a sniper as he got into his car, opposition activists said. Tank shells struck residential buildings in the suburbs of al-Qousour and al-Hamidiya." According to one resident, "The tanks are firing at random. They don't care who they hit. The aim seems to be to kill and terrify as many people as possible."' "The number of those wounded is huge and hospitals cannot cope, particularly because we lack the adequate equipment," said a Hama hospital worker, Dr Abdel Rahman. The death toll in Hama and Homs was reportedly 'slightly enlarged' according to the local governorate's sources. Government tanks also moved in on the eastern town of Abu Kamal and in the nearby city of Deir al-Zour, upwards of 29 tanks were witnessed over that weekend.

Activists and witnesses said at least 24 civilians were killed in attacks on several cities, including Hama, on 1 August. Later that day, the European Union imposed travel bans on five more military and government officials and extended sanctions against Assad's government, including Syrian Defence Minister Ali Habib Mahmud.

The UN Security Council met to discuss the situation in Syria on 2 August. The US, UK, and France wanted to formally condemn Syria, but Russia and China were afraid that "it could be used as a pretext for military intervention in Syria". The same day, Syrian dissident Radwan Ziadeh asked US president Barack Obama and US Secretary of State Hillary Clinton to demand President Assad step down.

By the morning of 3 August, Hama was under nearly continuous gunfire since the early hours of the morning and by midday, Syrian Army tanks stormed through rebel barricades in the city, occupying a central square. A post on the "Syrian Revolution" Facebook page read "The army is now stationed in Assi Square," and "The heroic youths of Hama are confronting them and banning them from entering neighborhoods." By this time, water, electricity and all communications in Hama and its surrounding villages and towns had been cut off, according to nearby online posts on social networking sites. The accounts could not be independently confirmed because the Syrian government banned foreign journalists from entering the country to report. Shaam, an online video channel that was aligned with the protest movement, posted a video dated 3 August that showed at least one tank attacking a neighbourhood that the narrator said was Hayy al-Hader in Hama; heavy plumes of smoke could be seen rising in the sky. Following the tank attacks, workers in Hama declared three days of general strike in memory of those killed by security forces.

Hama's Local Coordination Committee had e-mailed a statement saying that shelling was especially concentrated in the Janoub al-Mala'ab and Manakh districts. The group also claimed in the e-mail that civilians were being shot and houses shelled. Rami Abdel Rahman, the head of the SOHR, warned that "We might be witnessing another massacre in Hama."

The Russian foreign ministry's Middle East and North Africa Department chief, Sergei Vershinin, reminded the UN that his country was not "categorically" against adopting a UN resolution condemning the violence in Syria, but the Syrian Deputy Foreign Minister, Faisal Mekdad urged India to ignore Western "propaganda" if there was a vote over it in the Security Council.

A total of 200 people were killed in Hama by 4 August.

== Aftermath ==
The Attorney General of the Hama Governorate announced his resignation on 1 September 2011 in response to the Assad government's crackdown on protests. The government claimed he had been kidnapped and forced to lie at gunpoint.

On 28 February 2012, government forces shelled a town in Hama Province, Helfaya, killing 20 civilian villagers. Activists said the 20 deaths of Sunni Muslim villagers there were among at least 100 killed in the province in the last two weeks in revenge for rebel Free Syrian Army attacks on security forces commanded by members of Assad's minority Alawite sect.

== International reactions ==
=== Supranational organisations ===
- UN The Security Council passed a resolution that "condemns widespread violations of human rights and the use of force against civilians by the Syrian authorities." on 4 August.
- European Union The European Union imposed travel bans on five more military and government officials and extended sanctions against Mr Assad's ruling clique on 1 August.

=== States ===
- Germany – On 8 August the chairman of the German government's committee on foreign relations declared that there should be a global boycott of Syrian gas and oil exports with the aim to pressure Syria into ending its violence against protesters. On the same day, a German government spokesman declared that if Assad continues to reject dialogue and resort to violence, the Syrian government will lose its legitimacy.
- Italy – Foreign Minister Franco Frattini called the events in Hama "a horrible act of violent repression against protesters."
- Lebanon – Former Prime Minister and leader of the March 14 alliance Saad Hariri condemned what he called a "massacre" and the "bloody murders" that he said the Syrian people endure.
- Russia – On 1 August, the Kremlin, which has been a Syrian ally, in the person of President Dmitri A. Medvedev strongly condemned the government's actions in Hama, calling them "unacceptable."
- Turkey – President Abdullah Gül expressed horror over Syrian security forces' use of heavy weapons, including tanks, to quell civilian protests, saying "It's impossible to remain silent in the face of events visible to everyone. I urge the Syrian administration to stop violence against people and to carry out reforms to build the country's future on the base of peace and stability. We cannot remain silent and accept a bloody atmosphere".
- UK – A press release from the Prime Minister’s office requested that President Bashar-al Assad 'should reform or step aside' on the noon of 1 August. Foreign Secretary William Hague condemned the attack later that day, but said that any military action was not even "a remote possibility" and "There is no prospect of a legal, morally sanctioned military intervention".
- United States – President Barack Obama said the reports from Hama were horrifying and demonstrated the true character of the Syrian government, saying that Assad had again "shown that he is completely incapable and unwilling to respond to the legitimate grievances of the Syrian people". He said he was appalled by the government's use of "violence and brutality against its own people". Obama also vowed to diplomatically isolate Assad.

== See also ==
- 1982 Hama Massacre
- 2012 Hama massacre
- Siege of Aleppo (1980)
