= Syrian revolution =

Revolution in Syria (2011–2024)

- Part of the Syrian civil war, First Arab Spring, Arab Winter, and the Second Arab Spring
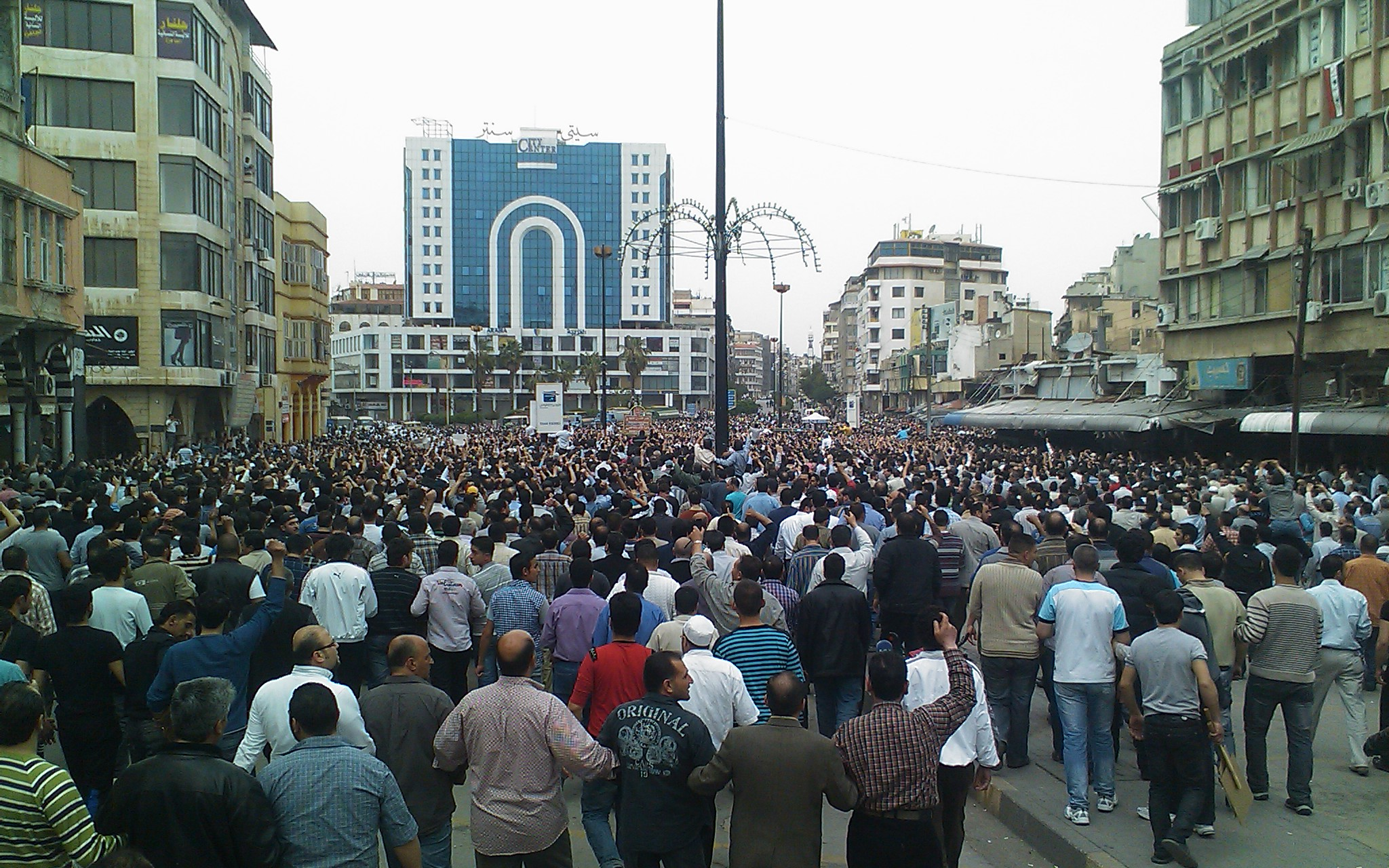
- Demonstration in Homs against the Syrian government, 18 April 2011
- Date: 15 March 2011 – 8 December 2024 (13 years, 8 months, 3 weeks and 2 days)
- Location: Ba'athist Syria
- Caused by: Government corruption; Unemployment; Aftermath of 1970s Islamist uprising in Syria and 1982 Hama massacre; Totalitarian rule; Political repression; State sponsored sectarianism; Clampdown on Damascus Spring; Nepotism of ruling elites; Discrimination of ethnic minorities; Torture and death of children in one of Daraa's prisons; Killing and mutilation of Hamza Ali al-Khateeb
- Goals: Overthrow of Bashar al-Assad; Democratic reforms; Regime change; Expanded civil rights; Abolition of the Supreme State Security Court; Lifting of the emergency law; Equal rights for Kurds among other minorities
- Methods: Civil resistance; Insurgency; Riots; Demonstrations; Army defections
- Result: Syrian opposition victory: Outbreak of full-scale civil war; Fall of the Assad regime (2024)

Parties
Syrian opposition^{a}; Syrian Salvation Government; Hay'at Tahrir al-Sham; (Syrian opposition) Syrian Interim Government; (Syrian opposition) Free Syrian Army	(Syria) Syrian government; Ba'ath Party; Syrian Arab Armed Forces; People's Army; Syrian Police; Shabiha; Popular Committees

Lead figures
Ahmed al-Sharaa; Ali Keda; Riad al-Asaad; Moaz al-Khatib	(Syria) Bashar al-Assad (Syria) Maher al-Assad (Syria) Fahd Jassem al-Freij (Syria) Ali Abdullah Ayyoub

Casualties and losses
- During the protest Over 12,617 arrested; 3,000 civilians forcibly disappeared (by 28 July); 1,800–2,154 killed During the civil war Around 620,000 killed (by December 2024) (See Casualties of the Syrian civil war for details)
- ^{a} During the civil uprising in the first half of 2011, the Syrian opposition used the same flag of Syria as the Syrian government.

The Syrian revolution was a series of mass protests and civilian uprisings throughout Syria – with a subsequent violent reaction by the Ba'athist regime – lasting from 2011 to 2024 as part of the greater Arab Spring in the Arab world. The revolution, which demanded the end of the decades-long Assad family rule, began as minor demonstrations during January 2011 and transformed into large nationwide protests in March. The uprising was marked by mass protests against the Ba'athist dictatorship of president Bashar al-Assad meeting police and military violence, massive arrests and a brutal crackdown, resulting in hundreds of thousands of deaths and tens of thousands wounded. (Note: Sources:) 13 years after the start of the revolution, the Assad regime fell in 2024 after a series of rebel offensives.

The phase of civil uprising created a platform for the emergence of armed opposition movements and massive defections from the Syrian army, which gradually transformed the conflict from a popular uprising/revolution into an armed insurgency, and subsequently a civil war. On 29 July 2011, the Free Syrian Army was formed, marking the beginning of armed operations against the Assad government. Since then, the conflict has taken the form of an armed rebellion, with the civil movement largely ceasing and members of the opposition resorting to armed struggle.

Despite Assad's attempts to crush the protests with crackdowns, censorship and concessions, the mass protests had become a full-blown revolution by the end of April. The Ba'athist government deployed its ground troops and airforce, ordering them to fight the rebels. The regime's deployment of large-scale violence against protestors and civilians led to international condemnation of the Assad government and support for the protestors. Discontent among soldiers led to massive defections from the Syrian Arab Army, while people began to form opposition militias across the country, gradually transforming the revolution from a civil uprising to an armed rebellion, and later a full-scale civil war. The Free Syrian Army was formed on 29 July 2011, marking the beginning of an armed insurgency.

As the Syrian insurgency progressed in October–December 2011, protests against the government simultaneously strengthened across northern, southern and western Syria. The uprisings were crushed by massive crackdowns, resulting in tens of thousands of deaths and hundreds of thousands of casualties, which angered many across the country. The regime also deployed sectarian Shabiha death squads to attack the protestors. Protests and revolutionary activities by students and the youth continued despite aggressive suppression. As opposition militias began capturing vast swathes of territory throughout 2012, the United Nations officially declared the clashes in Syria as a civil war in June 2012.

On 9 May 2011, the Syrian army entered a new phase, marked by the siege and invasion of Homs, the third largest city in Syria, which had witnessed demonstrations estimated to be attended by hundreds of thousands of people. Simultaneously, areas in the Homs countryside were subjected to military operations, leading to the siege of Talkalakh, followed by the sieges of Rastan and Talbiseh.

The unprecedented violence led to global backlash, with the United Nations Human Rights Council (UNHRC) convening an emergency session on 29 April 2011, and tasking a fact-finding mission to investigate the scale of atrocities in Syria. The investigation by the commission concluded that the Syrian Arab Army, secret police and Ba'athist paramilitaries engaged in massacres, forced disappearances, summary executions, show-trials, torture, assassinations, and persecution and abductions of suspects from hospitals, amongst others, with an official "shoot-to-kill" policy from the government. The UNHRC report published on 18 August stated that the atrocities amounted to crimes against humanity, with High Commissioner Navi Pillai urging Security Council members to prosecute al-Assad in the International Criminal Court. A second emergency session convened by the UNHRC on 22 August 2011 condemned the Assad government's atrocities and called for an immediate cessation of all military operations and engagement in Syrian-led political process, with numerous countries demanding Assad's resignation.

Finally in December 2024, the Syrian revolution achieved its main goal of achieving the fall of the Assad regime after Assad fled to Moscow. The fall of Damascus ended the Assad regime as the Syrian prime minister Mohammad Ghazi al-Jalali handed over power to the revolutionaries and they formed the Syrian transitional government.

== Background ==
From 1971, Syria was ruled as a military dictatorship under Hafez al-Assad. In the late 1970s and early 1980s, Syria experienced a major Islamist uprising against his rule. The uprising was brutally suppressed, culminating in the 1982 Hama massacre, during which over 40,000 civilians were killed.

Following the death of Hafez Al-Assad in 2000, his son Bashar al-Assad inherited the presidency. This coincided with a brief period of liberalization and debate regarding the country's future, in the form of the Damascus Spring, but hopes of Bashar pursuing a reformist agenda were dashed when his forces arrested many of the leaders of this movement, putting an end to it by late 2001. After winning the 2007 presidential election in Syria with 99.82% of the declared votes, Bashar al-Assad implemented numerous measures that further intensified political and cultural repression in Syria. The Assad government expanded its use of travel bans, restricting more than 400 dissidents, intellectuals, authors and artists living in Syria from travelling abroad. In September 2010, The Economist newspaper described the Syrian government as "the worst offender among Arab states". During this period, the Assad government arrested numerous journalists and shut down independent press centres, in addition to tightening its censorship of the internet.

Factors contributing to social disenchantment in Syria included socio-economic stress caused by the Iraqi conflict, as well as the most intense drought ever recorded in the region. For decades, the Syrian economy, army and government had been dominated by patronage networks of Ba'ath party elites and Alawite clients loyal to the Assad family. The Assad dynasty held a firm grip over most sectors of the Syrian economy and corruption was endemic in the public and private sectors. As early as the 1980s, the pervasive nature of corruption had been a source of controversy within Ba'ath party circles as well as the wider public. The persistence of corruption, sectarian bias, nepotism and widespread bribery within the party, bureaucracy and military contributed to popular anger that resulted in the large-scale protests of the revolution. Describing the presidency of Bashar al-Assad, his exiled cousin Ribal al-Assad stated in 2010, months before the start of the revolution: "He is still governing under the ghost of his father. Each person in Syria has an interest in the secret service. Bashar should have declared national unity as soon as he took over. He did things bit by bit, with internet cafes and so on. But it was not enough. There was no real change."

At the onset of the Arab Spring, Ba'athist Syria was considered the most restrictive police state in the Arab World, with a tight system of regulations on the movement of civilians, independent journalists and others. Reporters Without Borders listed Syria as the 6th worst country in its 2010 Press Freedom Index. Syria had remained superficially tranquil for decades, largely because of fear of arrest by the secret police. Protests were relatively modest until mid-March 2011, despite the wave of unrest that was spreading across the Arab world.

Minor protests calling for government reforms began in January 2011, and continued into March. At this time, massive protests were occurring in Cairo against Egyptian President Hosni Mubarak, and in Syria on 3 February via the websites Facebook and Twitter, activists called for a "Day of Rage" against the government to be held on Friday, 4 February. This did not result in protests.

== Civil uprising (March–July 2011) ==
=== March 2011 uprising ===
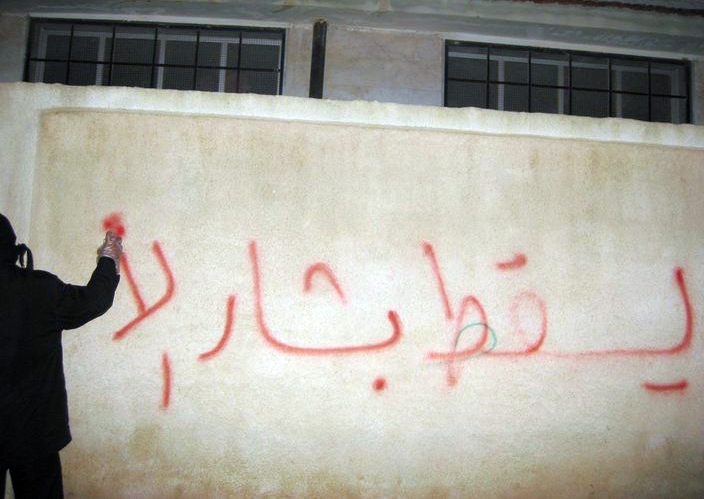
A wall with Anti-Assad graffiti "yaskuṭ Bašhār" (trans. "Down with Bashar!") during the start of the revolution

In the southern city of Daraa, protests had been triggered on 6 March 2011 by the incarceration and torture of 15 young students, including Mouawiya Syasneh, from prominent families who were arrested for writing anti-government graffiti in the city, reading: "الشعب يريد إسقاط النظام" – ("The people want the fall of the regime") – a trademark slogan of the Arab Spring. The boys also spray-painted the graffiti "Your turn, Doctor", alluding to Assad's training as an ophthalmologist. Security forces under the command of the city's security chief and the first cousin of President Assad, Atef Najib swiftly responded by rounding up the alleged perpetrators and detaining them for over a month, which set off large-scale protests in Daraa Governorate that quickly spread to other provinces. According to information given by interviewees to Human Rights Watch, protests in Daraa began peacefully, with demonstrators carrying olive branches, unbuttoning their shirts to show that they had no weapons, and chanting "peaceful, peaceful" to indicate that they posed no threat to the security forces. The Syrian Arab Army was soon deployed to shoot at the protests, resulting in a popular resistance movement led by locals, causing Daraa to become one of the first provinces to break free of regime control. Daraa would come to be known as the "Cradle of the Syrian Revolution".

The government later claimed that the boys weren't attacked, and that Qatar incited the majority of the protests. Writer and analyst Louai al-Hussein, referencing the Arab Spring ongoing at that time, wrote that "Syria is now on the map of countries in the region with an uprising". On 15 March, dubbed a "Day of Rage" by numerous demonstrators, pro-democracy activists and online opposition groups, hundreds of protestors marched in the city of Damascus, demanding Assad's overthrow. Over 35 protestors in Damascus were arrested by police forces in a subsequent crackdown ordered by Assad government.

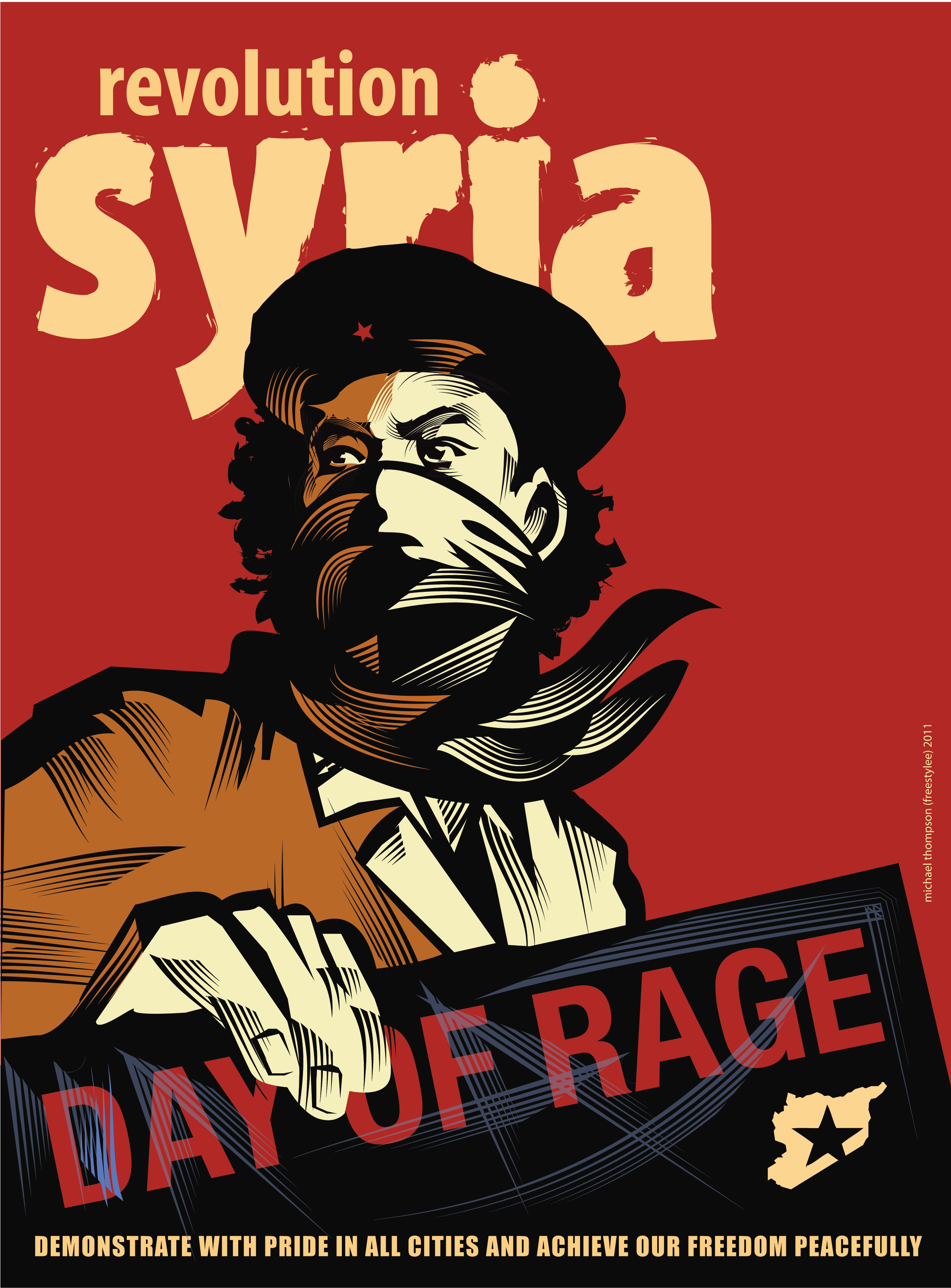
Syrian pro-democracy protest groups and activists launched a campaign to organise a "Day of Rage" demonstrations in Damascus and other cities on 25 March 2011. Online activists used social media networks like Facebook and Twitter to promote the protest campaign. This poster is also a reference to Che Guevara.

In Daraa, demonstrators clashed with local police, and confrontations escalated on 18 March after Friday prayers. Security forces attacked protestors gathered at the Omari Mosque using water cannons and tear gas, followed by live fire, killing four. On 20 March, a crowd burned down the Ba'ath Party headquarters and other public buildings. Security forces quickly responded, firing live ammunition at crowds, and attacking the focal points of the demonstrations. The two-day assault resulted in the deaths of seven police officers and fifteen protestors.

Meanwhile, minor protests occurred elsewhere in the country. Protestors demanded the release of political prisoners, the abolition of Syria's 48-year emergency law, more freedoms, and an end to pervasive government corruption. The events led to a "Friday of Dignity" on 18 March, when large-scale protests broke out in several cities, including Banias, Damascus, al-Hasakah, Daraa, Deir az-Zor, and Hama. Police responded to the protests with tear gas, water cannons, and beatings. At least six people were killed and many others injured.

On 23 March, units of the Fourth Division led by Maher al-Assad stormed a gathering in a Sunni mosque in Daraa, killing five civilians. Victims included a doctor who was treating the wounded. Anger at the incident arose exponentially in the province and across the country. The regime attempted to simmer down the protests by announcing tax-cuts and pay rises the next day. On 25 March, tens of thousands of people participated in the funerals of those killed, chanting: "We do not want your bread, we want dignity". Statues and billboards of Hafez al-Assad and Bashar al-Assad were demolished.

On 25 March, mass protests spread nationwide, as demonstrators emerged after Friday prayers. At least 20 protestors were killed by security forces. Protests subsequently spread to other Syrian cities, including Homs, Hama, Baniyas, Jasim, Aleppo, Damascus and Latakia. Over 70 protestors in total were reported killed.

In his public address delivered on 30 March, Assad said "conspirators" were pushing an "Israeli agenda", condemned the protests as a "foreign plot" and described those who were killed by the firing as a "sacrifice for national stability", sparking widespread outcry. Assad said reforms in Syria could be considered, but only after the country stabilized and economic conditions improved. However, he did not specify which reforms would be implemented nor did he offer any timeframe for change. A protestor who was the relative of one of the detained boys told reporters:

"He didn't ask the MPs to stand for a minute's silence and he said those who were killed were sacrificial martyrs.. But here in Daraa, the army and security deal with us like traitors or agents for Israel. We hoped our army would fight and liberate the occupied Golan, not send tanks and helicopters to fight civilians."

=== Crackdown ===
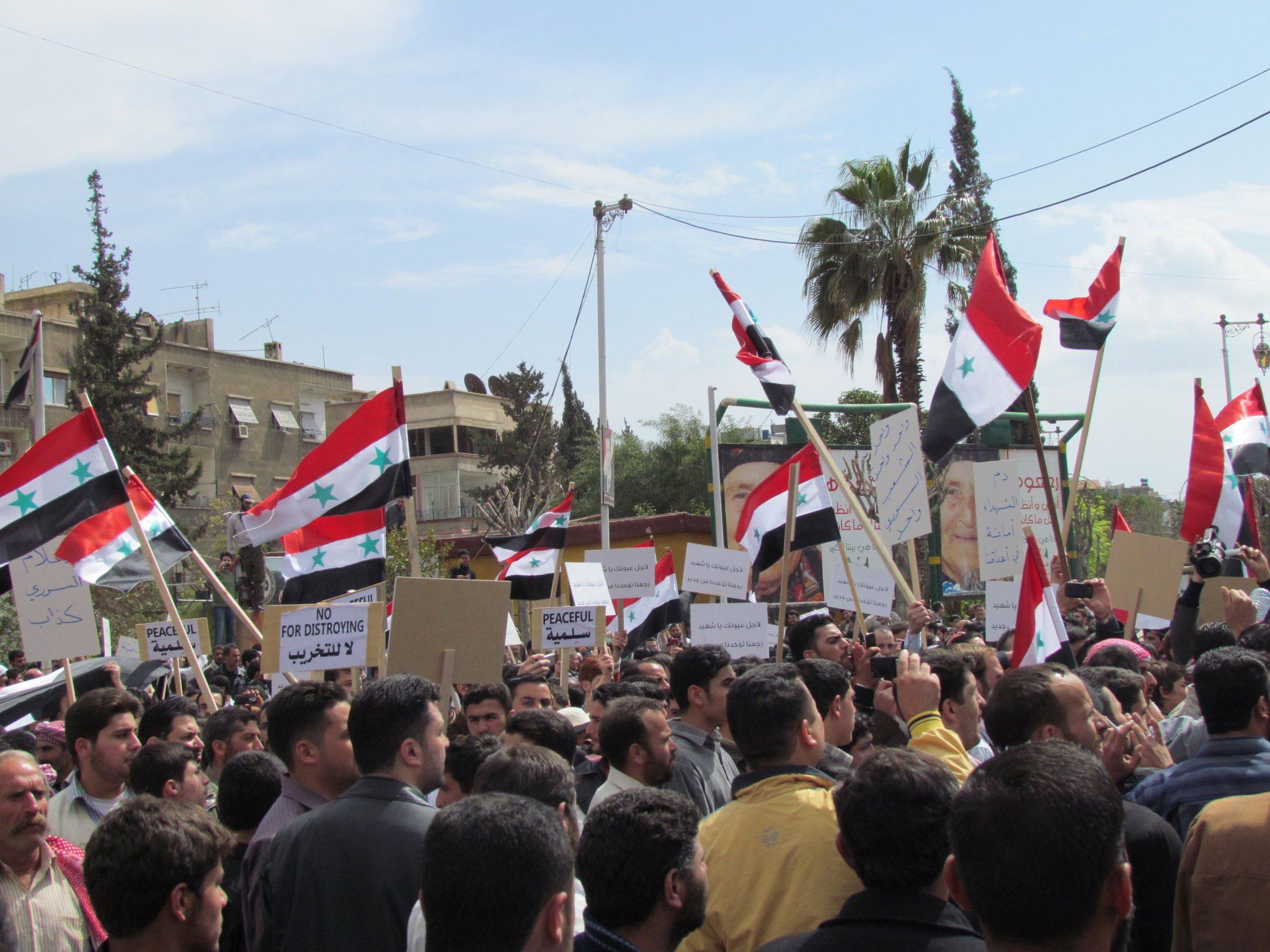
Demonstration in Douma, a Damascus suburb, against the Assad government on 8 April 2011.

Before the uprising, the Syrian government had arresed numerous political dissidents and human rights campaigners, considering many of them to be terrorists. In early February 2011, authorities arrested several activists, including political leaders Ghassan al-Najar, Abbas Abbas, and Adnan Mustafa. Government forces used Ba'ath party buildings as a base to organize the security forces and fire on protestors. The government employed deadly force against the peaceful demonstrators, deploying snipers, heavy machine guns and shelling. Those security officers who disagreed or held back were also fired upon by Ba'athist paramilitaries and Shabiha death squads from behind.

Police and security forces responded to the protests violently, using water cannons and tear gas as well as physically beating protestors and firing live ammunition. Shabiha death squads, composed of fervent Alawite loyalists, were ordered to execute sectarian attacks on the protestors, torture Sunni demonstrators and engage in anti-Sunni rhetoric. This policy led to large-scale desertions within the army ranks and further defections of officers who began forming a resistance movement.

As the uprisings intensified, the Syrian government arrested tens of thousands of people. In response to the uprising, Syrian law had been changed to allow the police and any of the nation's 18 security forces to detain a suspect for eight days without a warrant. Arrests focused on two groups: political activists, and men and boys from the towns that the Syrian Army would start to besiege in April. Many of those detained experienced ill-treatment. Many detainees were cramped in tight rooms and were given limited resources, and some were beaten, electrically jolted, or debilitated. At least 27 torture centers run by Syrian intelligence agencies were revealed by Human Rights Watch on 3 July 2012. State propaganda of the Alawite-dominated regime has attempted to portray any pro-democracy protests, even those that called for political pluralism and civil liberties, as "a project to sow sectarian strife."

Regime forces carried out brutal attacks against the inhabitants of Al-Rastan, displacing over 80% of its population. Characterizing the displaced civilians as "armed terrorist groups", Syrian Arab Armed Forces expanded its attacks on the civilians that sought refuge in nearby areas, resulting in 127 deaths. Early in the month of April, a large deployment of security forces prevented tent encampments in Latakia. Blockades were set up in several cities to prevent the movement of protests. Despite the crackdown, widespread protests continued throughout the month in Daraa, Baniyas, Al-Qamishli, Homs, Douma and Harasta.

=== Concessions ===
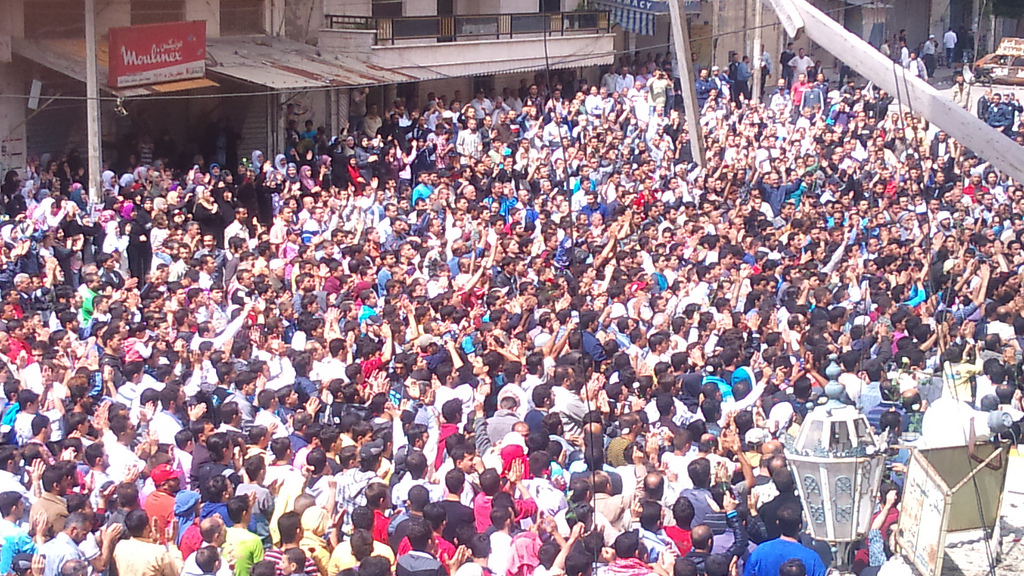
Anti-Assad demonstrations in Baniyas, 6 May 2011

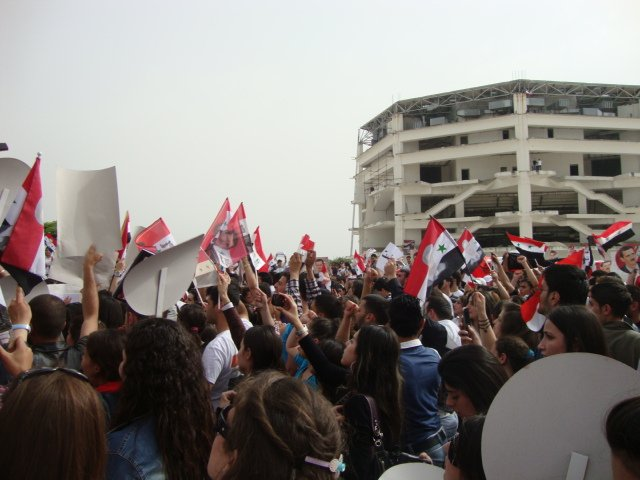
Pro-government demonstrations organized by the Ba'ath party at Tishreen University, Latakia on 23 May 2011.

During March and April, the Syrian government, hoping to alleviate the protests, offered political reforms and policy changes. Authorities shortened mandatory army conscription, and in an apparent attempt to reduce corruption, fired the governor of Daraa. The government announced it would release political prisoners, cut taxes, raise the salaries of public sector workers, provide more press freedoms, and increase job opportunities. Many of these announced reforms were never implemented.

The government, dominated by the Alawite sect, made some concessions to the majority Sunni and some minority populations. Authorities reversed a ban that restricted teachers from wearing the niqab, and closed the country's only casino. The government also granted citizenship to thousands of Syrian Kurds previously labeled "foreigners". Following Bahrain's example, the Syrian government held a two-day national dialogue in July, in attempt to alleviate the crisis. However, the representatives that held the dialogue were mostly Ba'ath party members; in addition to Assad loyalist figures and leaders of pro-regime satellite parties. As a result, many of the opposition leaders and protest leaders refused to attend due to the continuing crackdown on protestors in streets and tanks besieging cities.

A popular demand from protestors was an end of the nation's state of emergency, which had been in effect for nearly 50 years. The emergency law had been used to justify arbitrary arrests and detention, and to ban political opposition. After weeks of debate, Assad signed the decree on 21 April, lifting Syria's state of emergency. However, anti-government protests continued into April, with activists unsatisfied with what they considered vague promises of reform.

=== Military operations ===
==== April 2011 ====
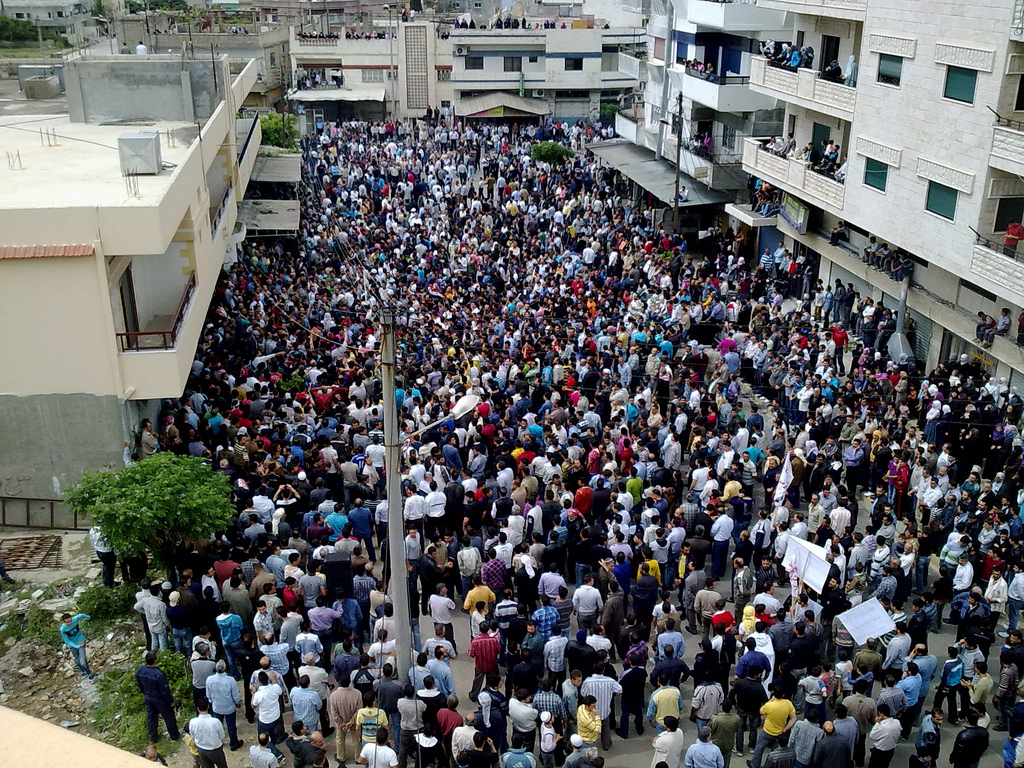
Opposition demonstration in Baniyas on 29 April 2011.

As the uprisings continued, the Syrian government began launching major military operations to suppress resistance, signaling a new phase in the uprising. On 25 April, Daraa, which had become a focal point of the uprising, was one of the first cities to be besieged by the Syrian Army. An estimated hundreds to 6,000 soldiers were deployed, firing live ammunition at demonstrators and searching house to house for protestors, slaughtering hundreds. Shabiha mercenaries, loyal to the Assad dynasty, were deployed in towns and cities across the country to unleash violence against Syrian civilians. They looted homes, businesses, and economic assets of populations targeted by the Ba'athist military apparatus.

Tanks were used for the first time against demonstrators, and snipers took positions on the rooftops of mosques. Mosques used as headquarters for demonstrators and organizers were especially targeted. Security forces began shutting off water, power and phone lines, and confiscating flour and food. Clashes between the army and opposition forces, which included armed protestors and defected soldiers, led to the death of hundreds.

By 28 April, the Syrian Arab armed forces had shut down all communications and completely besieged Daraa, resulting in starvation within the city. Defections from the Arab Socialist Ba'ath party also increased, as 233 members resigned on 28 April. This was in denunciation of the increasingly fatal violence that was getting unleashed on civilians.

Throughout April, Ba'athist security forces intensified its campaign of large-scale detainment and torture of Syrian protestors, journalists and activists across state prisons. On April 29, a 13-year-old boy named Hamza Ali al-Khateeb was arrested by forces of the Baathist mukhabarat during protests held in the village of Saida. For nearly a month, Hamza was held in police custody, where he endured regular torture and mutilation.

==== May 2011 ====
Syrian security forces open fire on protestors in Jisr ash-Shugur on 5 May 2011.

During the crackdown in Daraa, the Syrian Army also besieged and blockaded several towns around Damascus. Throughout May, situations similar to those that occurred in Daraa were reported in other besieged towns and cities, such as Baniyas, Homs, Talkalakh, Latakia, Jisr al-Shuggur, Aleppo, Damascus and several other towns and cities. After the end of each siege, violent suppression of sporadic protests continued throughout the following months.

On May 15, 2011, the Syrian Arab Army began a siege of the town of Talkalakh. Eight civilians were killed and at least 2,000 residents tried to flee from the city into Lebanon. Reports subsequently emerged that the SAA troops were massacring residents of the town.

On 20 May, security forces and Ba'athist militants based on a party training camp Al-Mastumah village in Idlib massacred a rally of peaceful demonstrators by firing without warning, killing 30 and injuring about 200. The injured were denied entry to hospitals. By 24 May, the names of 1,062 people killed in the uprising since mid-March had been documented by the National Organization for Human Rights in Syria.

"This is a campaign of mass terrorism and intimidation: Horribly tortured people sent back to communities by a regime not trying to cover up its crimes, but to advertise them."

— Ricken Patel

On May 24, Baathist mukhabarat released the mutilated body of Hamza Ali al-Khateeb to his family. A video of Hamza's mutilated body was uploaded online, triggering large-scale protests in Daraa, during which residents defied the military siege and came out in large numbers to protest police repression. Rezan Mustapha, spokesman of the opposition Kurdish Future Movement party stated: "This video moved not only every single Syrian, but people worldwide. It is unacceptable and inexcusable. The horrible torture was done to terrify demonstrators and make them stop calling for their demands."

==== June–July 2011 ====
Hundreds of thousands of protestors parade the flag of Syria and shout the trade mark Arab Spring slogan "Ash-shab yurid isqat an-nizam" (Arabic: الشعب يريد إسقاط النظام, lit. '"the people want to bring down the regime!"') in the Assi square of Hama on 22 July 2011

As the uprising progressed, opposition fighters became better equipped and more organized. Until September 2011, about two senior military or security officers defected to the opposition. Some analysts stated that these defections were signs of Assad's weakening inner circle. In the wake of increasing defections, soldiers who refused or neglected orders to shoot civilians were also killed.

The first instance of armed insurrection occurred on 4 June 2011 in Jisr ash-Shugur, a city near the Turkish border in Idlib. Angry protestors set fire to a building where security forces had fired upon a funeral demonstration. Eight security officers died in the fire as demonstrators took control of a police station, seizing weapons. Clashes between protestors and security forces continued in the following days. Some security officers defected after secret police and intelligence agents executed soldiers who refused to kill the civilians. On 6 June, Sunni militiamen and army defectors ambushed a group of security forces heading to the city which was met by a large government counterattack. Fearing a massacre, insurgents and defectors, along with 10,000 residents, fled across the Turkish border.

In June and July 2011, protests continued as government forces expanded operations, repeatedly firing at protestors, employing tanks against demonstrations, and conducting arrests. The towns of Rastan and Talbiseh, and Maarat al-Numaan were besieged in early June. On 30 June, large protests erupted against the Assad government in Aleppo, Syria's largest city. On 3 July, Syrian tanks were deployed to Hama, two days after the city witnessed the largest demonstration against Assad.

During the first six months of the uprising, the inhabitants of Syria's two largest cities, Damascus and Aleppo, remained largely uninvolved in the anti-government protests. The two cities' central squares have seen rallies of thousands of pro-Assad protestors marching in support of the Assad government, organized by the Ba'ath party.

On 11 July 2011, several Ba'athist cadres besieged and vandalized American and French embassies in Damascus, while chanting "We will die for you, Bashar". On 31 July, a nationwide crackdown, known as the "Ramadan Massacre", launched by Syrian military forces in towns, cities and villages across the country resulted in the killings of at least 142 people and hundreds of injuries. At least 95 civilians were killed in the city of Hama, after Ba'athist military forces shot at crowds of residents and bombed the streets of the city with tanks and heavy weaponry. Some besieged cities and towns fell into famine-like conditions. The Al-Balad neighbourhood in Daraa, under a brutal siege by Syrian Arab Armed Forces since late March, was described by Le Monde as a "ghetto of death". British foreign secretary William Hague condemned Assad for indiscriminate violence in Hama, and the German government threatened to impose additional sanctions. By the end of July, UN human rights organization estimated the death toll to have been around 2,000 people.

== Mass protests and Syrian armed revolution: August 2011 – June 2012 ==
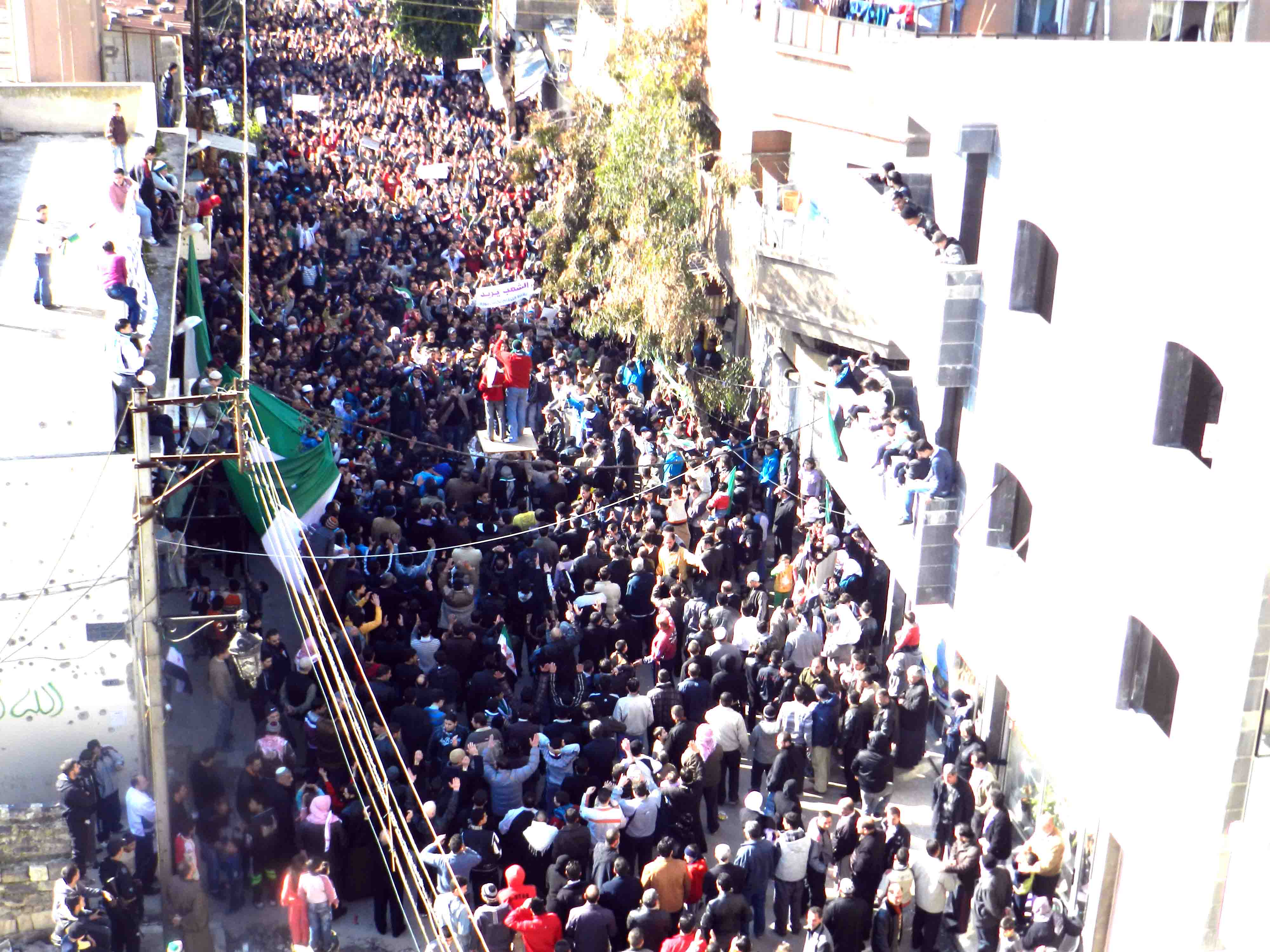
Protest against the Assad regime in the city of Homs, 3 February 2012

=== Intensified Ba'athist crackdowns and beginning of Syrian insurgency: August – September 2011 ===
Throughout August, Syrian forces stormed major urban centers and outlying regions, and continued to attack protestors. On 14 August, the Siege of Latakia continued as the Syrian Arab Navy became involved in the military crackdown for the first time. Gunboats fired heavy machine guns at waterfront districts in Latakia, as ground troops and security agents backed by armor stormed several neighborhoods. On 23 August, Syrian opposition factions and various dissidents formed a coalition of anti-Assad groups known as the Syrian National Council.

The Eid ul-Fitr celebrations, started in near the end of August, were suppressed by Assad government after Ba'athist military forces fired on large demonstrations in Homs, Daraa, and the suburbs of Damascus.

=== Escalation of Syrian revolution: October 2011 – June 2012 ===
Military situation as of mid-March 2012 Controlled by Ba'athist Syria Controlled by the Syrian opposition

Mass protests, rallies, demonstrations and riots continued throughout October and it was met with violent repression. In October 2011, 4 days of anti-government demonstrations led to beatings and fighting nationwide. Students, workers, employees, retirees, peasants, farmers, university students and street vendors participated in the movement daily. These protests started as 200 participants but it culminated as killings and beating was reported into tens of thousands. As rioting and looting was held, protestors were killed by security forces and in clashes between police and rioters, live ammunition and plastic bullets were fired. During the demonstrations on 18–19 November, 4–18 protestors were killed as they tried to March into Damascus and the Assad residence. Workers demanded their wages to be paid. Stones and rocks were thrown at billboards depicting Assad. During protests in Aleppo in May 2012, police fired tear gas and used gunfire, striking retirees. During demonstrations by farmers and workers in Raqqah in January–April, 21 people were killed in battles. Street protests in the hundreds continued until a raid on universities in September 2012.

The UN declared an official civil war in June 2012.

== Syrian Civil War ==
The Syrian revolution escalated into a full-blown civil war by the middle of 2012. Rebel forces, which received arms from Gulf Cooperation Council states, Turkey and some Western countries, initially made significant advances against the government forces, which were receiving financial and military support from Iran and Russia. Rebels captured the regional capitals of Raqqa in 2013 and Idlib in 2015. Consequently, Iran launched a military intervention in support of the Syrian government in 2014 and Russia followed in 2015, shifting the balance of the conflict. By late 2018, all rebel strongholds except parts of Idlib region had fallen to government forces.

In 2014, the Islamic State won many battles against both the rebel factions and the Syrian government. Combined with simultaneous success in Iraq, the group was able to seize control of large parts of Eastern Syria and Western Iraq, prompting the US-led CJTF coalition to launch an aerial bombing campaign against it, while providing ground support and supplies to the Syrian Democratic Forces, a Kurdish-dominated coalition led by the People's Defense Units (YPG). By way of battles that culminated in the Raqqa and Deir ez-Zor offensives, the Islamic State was territorially defeated by late 2017. In August 2016, Turkey launched a multi-pronged invasion of northern Syria, in response to the creation of Rojava, while also fighting the Islamic State and government forces in the process. Between the March 2020 Idlib ceasefire and late 2024, frontline fighting mostly subsided, but there were regular skirmishes.

=== Fall of Assad Regime ===
Agreement stipulating the integration of the Syrian Democratic Forces (SDF) into the institutions of the Syrian Arab Republic, 10 March 2025.

Heavy fighting renewed with a major rebel offensive in the northwest led by Tahrir al-Sham and supported by allied groups in the Turkish-backed Syrian National Army in November 2024, during which Aleppo, Hama and Homs were seized. Southern rebels who had previously reconciled with the government subsequently launched their own offensive, capturing Daraa and Suwayda. The Syrian Free Army and the Syrian Democratic Forces launched their own offensives in Palmyra and Deir ez-Zor, respectively. The fall of the Assad regime occurred on 8 December when Assad fled to Moscow during the Fall of Damascus. Prime Minister of Syria Mohammad Ghazi al-Jalali handed over power to the revolutionaries in December 8, 2024.

On the same day, Israel launched an invasion of Syria's Quneitra Governorate, aiming to seize the UN buffer zone in the Golan Heights. The SNA continued to clash with the SDF in and around Aleppo.

In January 2025, the Syrian transitional government announced the dissolution of several armed militias and their integration into the Syrian Ministry of Defence, as well as the appointment of Ahmed al-Shara'a as president of Syria during the transitional phase.

The EU has pledged $2.7 billion in aid to Syria to help the country rebuild. The bloc made the pledge at a gathering of donor countries while warning that recent violence could threaten the progress made under the new leadership in Damascus.

== Aftermath ==
"Almost two decades before the United States passed the Voting Rights Act... Syrians chose Fares al-Khoury, a Protestant Christian, as their prime minister. The Syrian uprising of 2011 was based on a desire to return to our grand past. It was a protest movement of all faiths... But the Assad regime cracked down with unspeakable horrors. More than 200,000 people have been killed as the regime deployed its full arsenal, including barrel bombs and sarin gas, against civilians. More than 9 million Syrians have been displaced, including more than 3 million refugees, and thousands have been tortured to death in Assad's dungeons. All this occurred while the world looked on."

— Syrian Sufi scholar Muhammad al-Yaqoubi

The unprecedented brutality of the Assad regime's crackdown on Syrian civilians resulted in global outcry and aroused strong condemnation from international bodies like the Arab League, United Nations and European Union. Two emergency sessions were convened by the United Nations Human Rights Council in response to the crackdown, on 29 April and 18 August 2011 respectively. An investigative mission appointed by the UN found the Assad regime responsible for mass-killings, assassinations, abductions, forced disappearances and other war crimes; as a result of a shoot to kill policy directly ordered by the government. UNHRC High Commissioner urged Security Council to prosecute Assad in the International Criminal Court. During the second emergency session on 18 August, several member states of the Human Rights Council demanded the resignation of Assad, while other countries called on Syrian government to immediately cease all its crackdown efforts and initiate dialogue for a political solution with the protestors.

On 29 July, a group of defected officers announced the formation of the Free Syrian Army (FSA). Composed of defected Syrian Armed Forces personnel, the rebel militia sought the defence of civilians from army shootings and eventually remove Assad from power. On 23 August, the Syrian National Council was formed as a political counterpart to the FSA. Civilians began forming resistance militias across the country to defend themselves from the attacks of Ba'athist security apparatus. As the armed resistance began establishing control over vast swathes of regions across Syria throughout 2012, UN officially described the conflict as a "civil war" on 12 June 2012.

During the unrest, several Kurdish militias formed the Kurdish Supreme Committee, which declared itself as a self-governing entity and lifted the ban on Kurdish language in territories under its control. The crackdown campaigns were intensified by the regime throughout 2011–12; with Assad ordering Syrian Air Force to launch aerial bombardment of civilian areas. By the end of 2012, over 60,000 Syrian civilians had been slaughtered by Syrian military forces.

=== 2023 Syrian protests ===
Over 12 years after the start of the 2011 uprisings, mass protests erupted in the Druze-majority city of Suwayda. By August 24, large-scale protests arose nationwide and expanded to the regions of Daraa, Latakia, Tartus, Deir-al-zor, Hasakah, Homs, and others. Protestors in regime-held areas waved revolutionary banners, chanted anti-government slogans, and demanded the downfall of the Ba'athist regime. By the end of August 2023, the nationwide protests resembled the revolutionary mass demonstrations of early 2011.

== Media coverage and censorship ==
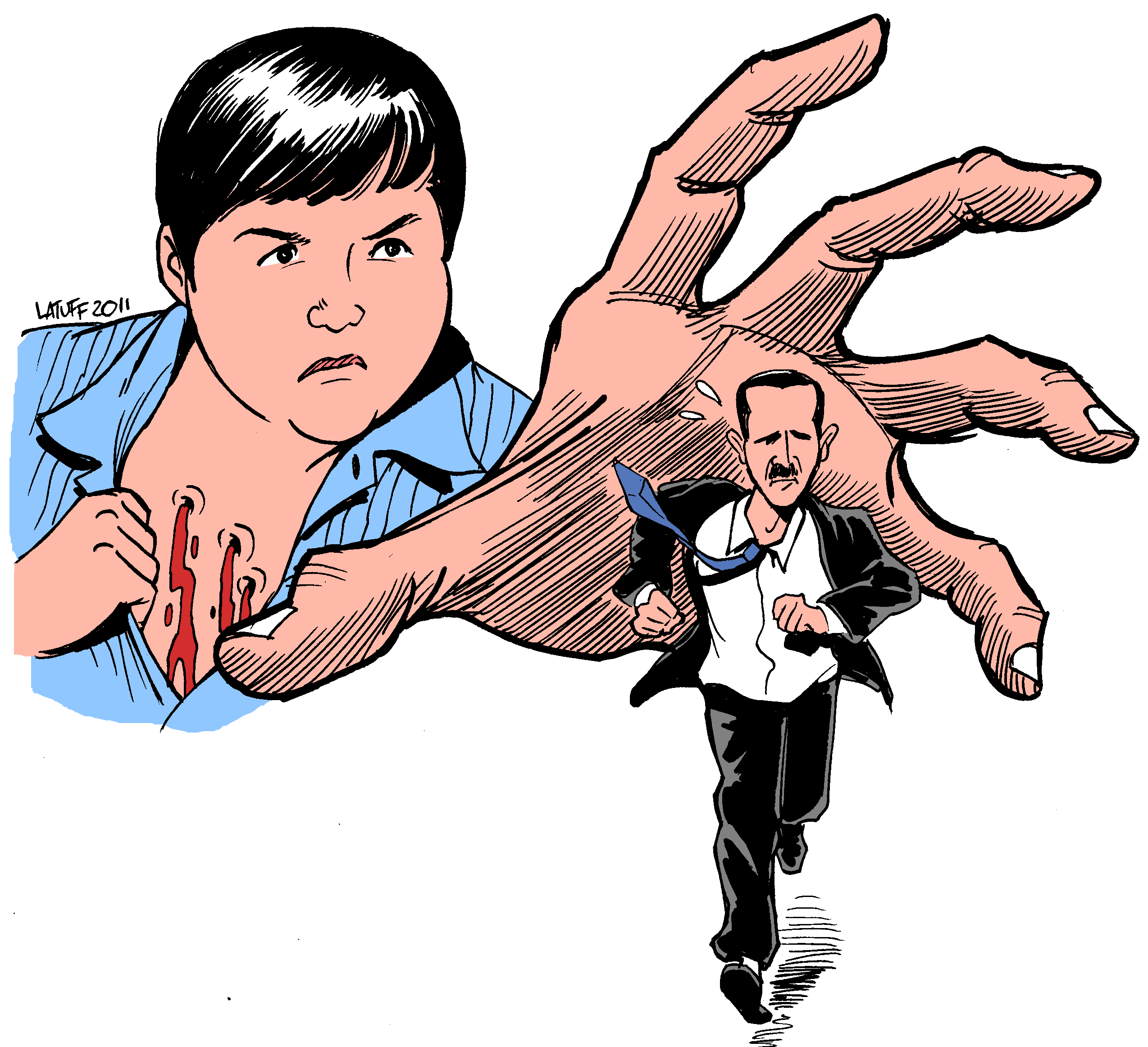
Carlos Latuff's cartoon depicting Bashar al-Assad fleeing from Hamza Ali al-Khateeb, the Syrian boy whose killing became a global symbol of Bashar al-Assad's brutality

Reporting on this conflict was difficult and dangerous from the start: journalists were being attacked, detained, tortured and killed.

Technical facilities (internet, telephone, etc.) were sabotaged by the Syrian government. Both sides in the conflict tried to discredit their opponent by framing or referring to them with negative labels and terms or by presenting false evidence.

When demonstrations began in March, the Assad government imposed a complete media blackout banning independent news coverage, barring foreign free press outlets and arresting reporters who tried to cover protests. Some journalists were reported missing, detained, tortured in custody, or killed on duty. International media relied heavily on footage shot by civilians, who often uploaded the files on the internet. In a 2012 report, the Committee to Protect Journalists described Syria as the third most censored country in the world.

The Assad government's cyberforces disabled mobile phones, landlines, electricity, and the internet in several places. Authorities extracted passwords of social media sites from journalists through beatings and torture. A pro-Assad hacker group called the Syrian Electronic Army frequently hacked websites to post Ba'athist propaganda, and the Assad government was implicated in malware attacks targeting those reporting on the crisis. The Assad government also targeted and tortured political cartoonist Ali Farzat, who was critical of the crackdown.

== International reactions ==
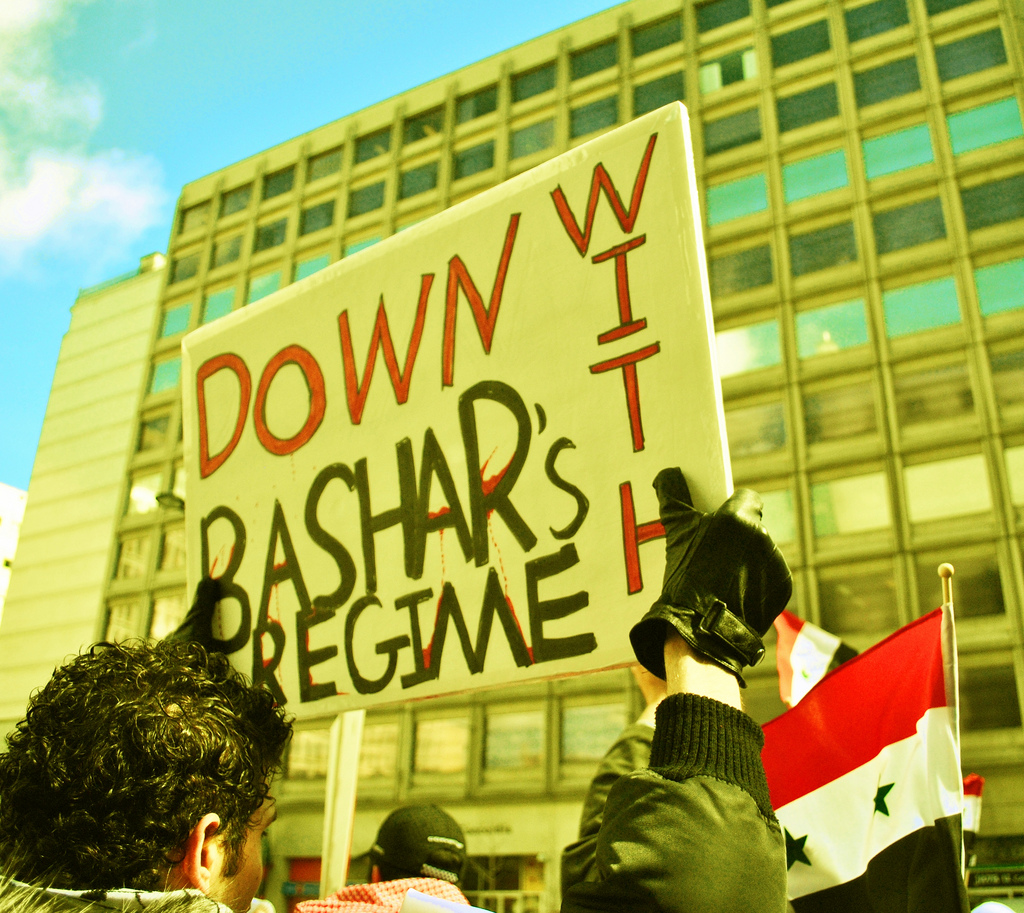
Demonstration in Montreal on 27 March, in support of the Syrian protestors

The Arab League, European Union, United Nations, and many Western governments condemned the Syrian government's violent crackdown against the protests, and many expressed support for the Syrian revolution. Amnesty International reported on 6 July 2011 that the Syrian government's violent repression of the inhabitants of the town of Talkalakh amounted to a "systematic campaign of crimes against humanity".

On 9 July, Human Rights Watch organization published a report confirming the Assad government ordered Syrian Arab Army (SAA) soldiers to shoot and arbitrarily detain protestors during demonstrations. The group cited SAA defectors who stated that if they did not obey orders, they would have been shot by Assad loyalists. The New York Times reported in mid-September that the United States and Turkey, both of whom condemned regime violence against peaceful protestors in Syria, were working together to prepare for a post-Assad Syria. A November 2011 poll by the Arab American Institute revealed that the overwhelming majority of Arabs sided with the revolutionaries against the regime and that support for Bashar had virtually eroded in Shia-majority regions in Lebanon.

On 22 March, Catherine Ashton, the High Representative of the Union for Foreign Affairs and Security Policy, issued a statement which said the European Union "strongly condemns the violent repression, including through the use of live ammunition, of peaceful protests in various locations across Syria". Ashton reiterated the EU's condemnation on 31 July after the Assad government's massacre in Hama, which resulted in the killing of over 200 inhabitants of the city. Ashton said on 18 August, "The EU notes the complete loss of Bashar al-Assad's legitimacy in the eyes of the Syrian people and the necessity for him to step aside." On 3 August, the United Nations Security Council denounced the Assad government's violent repression of protests and issued a statement condemning "the widespread violations of human rights and the use of force against civilians by the Syrian authorities".

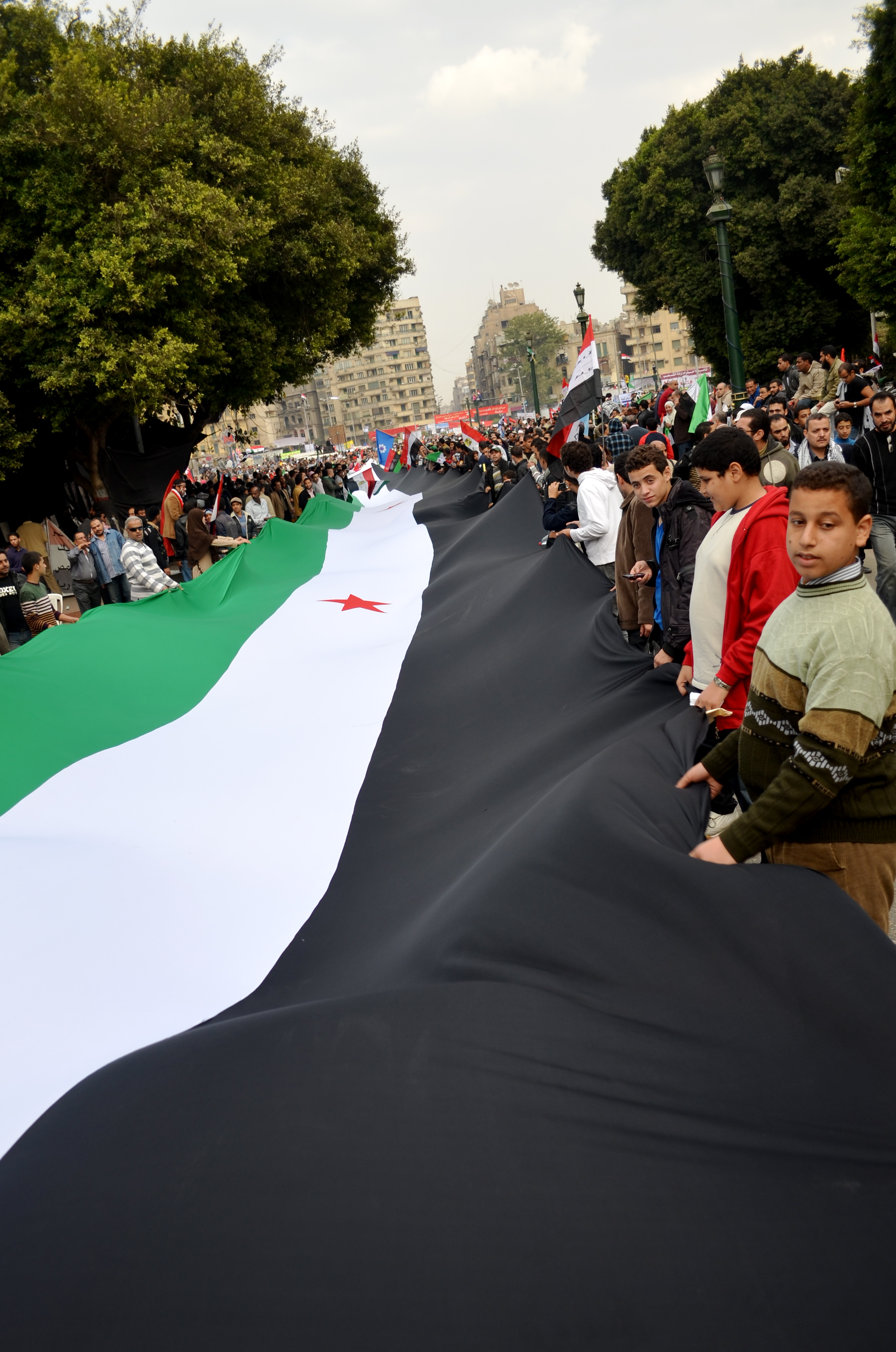
Demonstration in Cairo in solidarity with protestors in Syria, 4 February 2012

In a joint statement of its member states released on 6 August, the Gulf Cooperation Council (GCC) denounced "mounting violence and the excessive use of force which resulted in killing and wounding large numbers" and "express[ed] sorrow for the continuous bloodshed". On 12 November, the Arab League announced that it would suspend Syria from the organization if Bashar's government did not stop violence against protestors by 16 November, and invited Syria's opposition parties to join talks in the League's headquarters in Cairo. Syria, Lebanon, and Yemen voted against the action, while Iraq abstained from the vote. The League also warned of possible sanctions against Syria.

On 23 November 2011, the U.S. embassy in Damascus issued a warning for all American nationals to depart Syria "immediately while commercial transportation is available". On 24 November, a Reuters news dispatch reported U.S. Navy Carrier Strike Group 2 operating off the coast of Syria to monitor the ongoing Syrian uprising, with an unnamed Western diplomat in the region noting: "It is probably routine movement. But it is going to put psychological pressure on the regime, and the Americans don't mind that." On 25 November 2011, Russia, China, and other BRICS countries urged the Assad government to start talks with the Syrian opposition.

On 4 February 2012, over 150 protestors gathered outside the Syrian embassy in London, UK, at 2nbspam after reports emerged that over 200 people were massacred by government forces in Homs. The Metropolitan Police arrested some protestors. Later in the day, another crowd of around 300 protestors clashed with police outside the embassy. The same day, around 50 protestors ransacked the Syrian embassy in Cairo, Egypt .

== Commemoration ==
In October 2025, President Ahmed al-Sharaa issued a presidential decree making 18 March, "Syrian Revolution Day", an annual holiday.

== See also ==
- Haitian Revolution of 1986, a similar revolution against the Haitian dictator of Baby Doc Duvalier in Haiti against the Duvalier dictatorship
- Timeline of the Syrian civil war
- Timeline of the Arab Spring
- List of Syrian defectors
