= Atef Najib =

Syrian criminal and former security official (born 1960)

- عاطف نجيب
- Born: 1960 (age 65–66); Jableh, Syria
- Status: Incarcerated on death row
- Convictions: Crimes against humanity; Murder; Torture
- Penalty: Death

Details
- Country: Syria
- Date apprehended: 31 January 2025

Head of the Political Security Directorate in Daraa
- In office 2008 – April 2011
- President: Bashar al-Assad
- Succeeded by: Nasser al-Ali

Personal details
- Parent(s): Fatima Makhlouf (mother); Najib Alaa (father)
- Relatives: Reem Najib (sister); Norma Najib (sister); Ammar Najib (brother); Bashar al-Assad (first cousin)

Military service
- Allegiance: Ba'athist Syria
- Rank: Brigadier General
- Battles/wars: Syrian civil war

Atef Najib (Arabic: عاطف نجيب; born 1960) (Note: Also known as Atef Haj Najib, according to official documents observed by Zaman al-Wasl) is a Syrian convicted criminal and former security official and head of political security in Daraa Governorate. A first cousin of former Syrian President Bashar al-Assad, he became infamous for being a catalyst for one of the flashpoints that ignited the Syrian civil war, when in 2011 he directed the abduction and torture of 15 boys who had written anti-Assad slogans in a public area in the city of Daraa. His aggressive actions prompted non-violent protests by local inhabitants, and—after security forces opened fire at a protest march—the gradual start of armed resistance.

Upon the fall of the Assad regime, he was arrested by Syrian security forces in rural Latakia on 31 January 2025. On 29 April 2026, Najib was the first figure of the Assad regime to face trial in Damascus. He was subsequently sentenced to death on 11 August 2026.

== Early life ==
He was born in Jableh, Latakia, in 1960, to an Alawite mother, Fatima Makhlouf, and a Sunni father, Najib Alaa. (Note: Also spelled Najib Haj Najib, Najib Ala'a, and Najib Alaah.) Fatima was the sister of Anisa Makhlouf, wife of former Syrian president and father of Bashar, Hafez al-Assad, while Alaa was a roadside gas seller from Jableh. Atef had two sisters, Reem and Norma, and two brothers, one of whom is Ammar. Alaa and his family had benefited from Hafez's rise to power, and had intended to build a financial empire, similarly to his brother-in-law Mohammed Makhlouf, but not with the same level of success or cleverness, eventually serving in prison for several months for irritating Hafez with his corruption and clumsiness.

After graduating from Syria's military academy, Atef grew close to his cousin Bassel al-Assad prior to his death in 1994, with the two sharing similar personalities and enjoyment from driving recklessly in fast cars.

== Career ==
Atef quickly joined the Syrian intelligence apparatus, but had been sacked in 1992 due to his rude and arrogant behavior, only getting rehired six years later because Fatima successfully convinced Hafez that he had matured. Atef was reinstated to his old position and was reassigned to become Deputy Head of the Political Security Directorate in Damascus, residing in an office in Mezzeh.

In Damascus, serving as a junior officer, Atef grew increasingly wealthy through managing a "personal fiefdom", along with surveilling political figures and the police, as well as extorting businessmen. For example, a dispute between him and businessman and politician Muhammad Mamoun al-Homsi resulted in the two drawing weapons on each other in Shahbandar Square, followed by al-Homsi being arrested months later and sentenced to five years in prison. However, Atef was steadily sidelined by higher-ranking officials such as Ghazi Kanaan in 2002 due to his arrogance. Atef served in political security in Tartus Governorate from 2002 to 2004.

Atef, due to his declining influence in the intelligence apparatus, accepted his appointment as head of political security in Daraa Governorate in late 2008. In Daraa, Atef constructed an "intricate personal web of control" and financial empire based around Daraa's financial infrastructure. For example, he controlled and monopolized the entry and exit of goods within the governorate, including cross-border trade with Jordan, and water infrastructure, the latter of which was very important for Daraa's agricultural economy. He also extorted businessmen, traders, and their families, built a network of spies and informants throughout the province. Symbolizing his control of the governorate, Najib was quoted by The National as having said "In Daraa, I am God".

=== Role during the Syrian revolution ===
On 6 March 2011, 15 young boys, including Mouawiya Syasneh, were arrested for writing anti-government graffiti in the city, reading: "الشعب يريد إسقاط النظام" – ("The people want the fall of the regime") – a trademark slogan of the Arab Spring. The boys also spray-painted the graffiti "Your turn has come, O Doctor"; directly alluding to Bashar al-Assad, who was previously an ophthalmologist in the United Kingdom. The arrest caused outrage from Daraa's residents, who soon began protesting against the Syrian government, thus sparking the Syrian revolution. In an infamous meeting between Atef and representatives of the children's families on 18 March, Atef had said, "Forget your children. If you want children, make more children. If you don't know how, bring us your women and we will make them for you," furthering discontent against the government within Daraa.

In an attempt to defuse the protests, Atef and former Daraa Governor Faisal Kalthoum were removed from office in early April and 23 March, respectively, and were placed under investigation by a judicial committee established by the Syrian government. Atef was succeeded by Nasser al-Ali. On 13 June 2011, the committee imposed a travel ban on Atef. Despite this, he was transferred to become head of Political Security of Idlib Governorate in 2011, and was only arrested for a few days before being released due to Fatima's intervention, contrary to the advice from Western diplomats.

Atef was sanctioned by the United States via an executive order signed by then-US president Barack Obama on 29 April 2011, the European Union on 9 May 2011, Canada on 24 May 2011, Japan on 9 September 2011, and Australia on 25 February 2012.

== Post-Assad regime ==
After the fall of the Assad regime and the formation of the Syrian caretaker government, Atef was arrested by General Security in rural Latakia on 31 January 2025. Mustafa Kneifati, director of General Security in Latakia Governorate, stated that day that "through a qualitative operation, the General Security Directorate, in cooperation with military forces, managed to arrest Atef Najib". He added that the arrest of Atef Najib, considered "one of those involved in committing crimes against the Syrian people", came "within the framework of the authorities' efforts to hold accountable those involved in violations against the Syrian people and enhance security and stability in the region", and that he had been transferred to the relevant authorities for trial and accountability for his crimes against the Syrian people.

Kneifati explained to Syria TV that the operation to arrest Atef was launched after Atef's movements had been monitored. According to Kneifati, he had traveled from Damascus to rural Jableh to try to hide, and was attempting to flee Syria via smuggling routes alongside other former officers, but had been ambushed by security forces near Al-Haffah, resulting in his arrest.

=== Trial and sentence ===
On 26 April 2026, Syrian authorities opened the first public trial of senior figures from the Assad regime at the Justice Palace in Damascus, under tight security and strict judicial measures, in the presence of the Republic's Attorney General, Judge Hassan al-Turba, with the session chaired by the head of the Fourth Criminal Court and focused on the case of Atef. Najib is facing at least 10 charges, including murder, torture and responsibility for massacres, with 75 plaintiffs filling charges against him.

By July 2026, five hearings had been held, with the fifth, on 14 July, focused on prosecution witnesses. A report by Enab Baladi noted that the first two hearings showed notable openness and organization, while raising concerns over defense rights, the presumption of innocence, witness protection, and the legal characterization of the alleged crimes.

On 11 August 2026, the Syrian court convicted Najib of premeditated and intentional murder and torture resulting in death, and sentenced him to death.
