= Ash-shab yurid isqat an-nizam =

Political slogan used during the Arab Spring

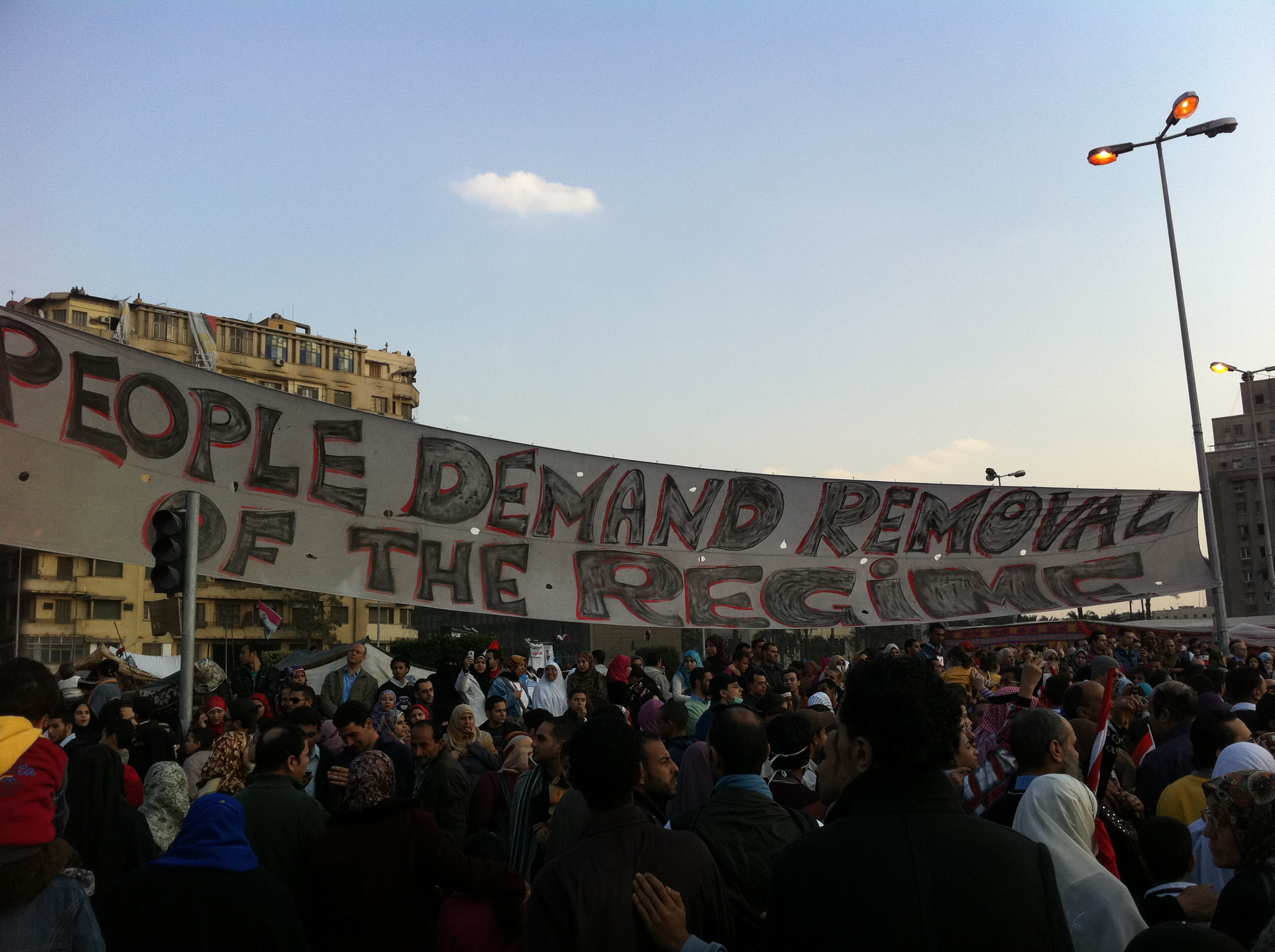
English version of the slogan at a rally in Tahrir Square

Ash-shaʻb yurīd isqāṭ an-niẓām (Arabic: الشعب يريد إسقاط النظام, lit. 'the people want to topple the regime', pronounced [æʃˈʃaʕb juˈriːd ʔɪsˈqɑːtˤ ænniˈðˤɑːm]) is a political slogan associated with the Arab Spring. The slogan first emerged during the Tunisian Revolution. The chant echoed at Avenue Habib Bourguiba in Tunis for weeks. The slogan also became used frequently during the 2011 Egyptian revolution. It was the most frequent slogan, both in graffiti and in chants in rallies, during the revolution in Egypt.

The chant was raised during the uprising in Bahrain. It was frequently used in protests across Yemen. The slogan was used in rallies across Libya at the beginning of the 2011 revolt. In March 2011, a group of youths under the age of 15 were arrested in Dera'a in southern Syria, after having sprayed ejak el door ya doctor graffiti, translating to "Your turn has come, O Doctor" (referring to the regime of Bashar al-Assad, who practiced ophthalmology). Their arrests sparked the uprising and subsequent civil war in Syria. The slogan was also used frequently in Sudan throughout the protests.

In Lebanon, the slogan has been used in protests against that country's sectarian political system. In the Lebanese protests, an-niẓām ("the regime") did not refer to the sectarian political order as such, but rather the government.

== Variants ==
Syrian Islamists have appropriated the slogan for their own purposes, altering it to ash-sha’ab yurīd i’lān al-Jihād (الشعب يريد إعلان الجهاد, 'the people demand declaration of jihad'), as well as al-Ummah turīd khilāfah islāmiyyah (الأمة تريد خلافة إسلامية, 'the Ummah demands an Islamic caliphate').

In post-Mubarak Egypt, given the fact that the military government only partially met the demands of the revolutionaries, with the state of emergency remaining in place, some protesters started using a somewhat different version of the slogan: The people want to bring down the field marshal, referring to Field Marshal Mohamed Tantawi, the Chairman of the Supreme Council of the Armed Forces.

Variations of the slogan were used by counter-revolutionaries, including by Bashar al-Assad's supporters in Syria as ash-shaʻb yurīd Bashār al-Asad (الشعب يريد بشار الاسد, 'the people want Bashar al-Assad'), by Gaddafists in Libya as ash-shaʻb yurīd Muʻammar al-ʻaqīd (الشعب يريد معمر العقيد, 'the people want Colonel Muammar'), and by King Hamad's loyalists in Bahrain as ash-shaʻb yurīd isqāṭ al-Wifāq (الشعب يريد إسقاط الوفاق, 'the people want to bring down Al-Wefaq'), referring to the main opposition party of Bahrain, Al-Wefaq.

In Jordan, a youth group named "24 March" used the slogan ash-shaʻb yurīd iṣlāḥ an-niẓām (الشعب يريد إصلاح النظام, 'the people want to reform the system'). However, the slogan later changed to ash-shaʻb yurīd isqāṭ an-niẓām in November 2012, when the government imposed a hike in the price of fuel.

In Palestine, a variation of the slogan, Ash-shaʻb yurīd inhāʼ al-inqisām (الشعب يريد إنهاء الانقسام, 'the people want the division to end'), emerged in protests calling for the two main factions Fatah and Hamas to settle their differences.

During the 2011 Israeli social justice protests, the slogan "The people want social justice" was used, chanted in Hebrew to the same cadence as ash-shaʻb yurīd isqāṭ an-niẓām.

The slogan was adopted to ash-shaʻb yurīd isqāṭ al-taṭbīʻ (الشعب يريد إسقاط التطبيع, 'the people want the downfall of normalization') in protests in Morocco against the normalization of relations with Israel.

== Context ==
Uriel Abulof, professor of politics at Tel-Aviv University and a senior research fellow at Princeton University, commented:

Virtually all English renditions of the uprising's call missed its singular, key letter: "The people wants to bring down the regime." This seeming semantics marks a sea-change in political ethics. For in the two long centuries since Napoleon landed in Alexandria, the moral foundation of modern politics -- popular sovereignty -- has been absent from the Arab Middle East. The Arab people became the object for colonizers, dictators and imams, with their call to submission and arms. Never a subject for thought and action, the people lacked political agency, powerless to forge a collective moral self, let alone a nation to demand self-determination: the right to tell right from wrong in the public sphere. Whether Arab popular uprisings will eventually transform political systems – thus nominally qualified as real revolutions – remains to be seen. But one revolution is real and clear: the people (شعب, sha'ab) was born – a collective, rather than a collection, of individuals, a whole greater than the sum of its parts. The uprising's slogan was not simply, as one might have expected, "down with the regime." It is precisely because the demonstrates felt that the existence of such a people, let alone one in possession of agency, is far from obvious, that they added, in a resolute speech-act – an act created by speech – "the people wants."

Benoît Challand, teaching Middle Eastern politics at the University of Bologna, commented on the slogan in the following way:

The rendering of autonomy in Arabic illustrates my point as the term is translated as tasayyir daati [sic] – that is the "self-impulse," or "self-drive." And indeed, once the initial spark was lit, it was as if the Tunisian people moved as a whole, into spontaneous protests. Egyptian, Libyan, and Yemeni people called for the fall of their respective regime. The slogan "ash-sha’b yourid isqat al-nithaam" [the people want the fall of the regime], appearing across the region, captures this social cohesion (the people) and the unity in the project.

Rashid Khalidi, the Edward Said professor of Arab studies at Columbia University and the editor of the Journal of Palestine Studies, commented in the following manner:

It will largely be determined in these streets, as well as in the internet cafes, and in the union halls, newspaper offices, women's groups and private homes of millions of young Arabs who have served notice as publicly as possible that they will no longer tolerate being treated with the contempt and disrespect their governments have shown them for their entire lives. They have put us all on notice with their slogan: "The people want the fall of the regime." They are not only referring to their corrupt governments; they also mean the old regime that has prevailed for decades in the entire Arab world, from the Atlantic to the Gulf.

== Video clips ==
Anti-Assad protesters chanting the slogan in the Assi square, during the Siege of Hama on 22 July 2011

Anti-Ali Abdullah Saleh protesters chanting the slogan in Sanaa in 2012

== See also ==
- El pueblo unido jamás será vencido
- Arab Spring
- 2023 Gaza economic protests, during which protestors used the slogan against the ruling Hamas government
