= Siege of Daraa =

Syrian military operation in the Syrian city of Daraa

Coordinates: 32.6167°N 36.1167°E

- Part of the Syrian revolution and the Syrian civil war
Date	25 April – 5 May 2011 (1 week and 3 days)
Location	Daraa, Syria
Result	Syrian government victory: Anti-government protests suppressed in the city

Belligerents
Syrian Opposition	Ba'athist Syria

Commanders and leaders
	Gen. Maher al-Assad; Gen. Atef Najib; Gen. Mohsin Makhlouf; Gen. Ahmed Yousef Jarad; Gen. Ramadan Ramadan; Col. Suheil al-Hassan

Units involved
Syrian Opposition; (Syrian opposition) Opposition protesters; (Syrian opposition) Defecting soldiers	Syrian Armed Forces; Syrian Army; 4th Armoured Division; 42nd brigade; 5th Mechanized Division; 12th brigade; 15th brigade; 112th brigade; 132nd brigade; 175th army regiment; 15th Special Forces Division; 35th regiment; 41st regiment

Casualties and losses
(Syrian opposition) 50–220 protesters killed (Syrian opposition) 600–1,000 protesters arrested (Syrian opposition) 81 defected soldiers killed	25 soldiers killed 177 soldiers wounded

The siege of Daraa occurred within the context of the 2011 Arab Spring protests in Syria, in which Daraa was the center of unrest. On 25 April 2011, the Syrian Army began a ten-day siege of the city, an operation that helped escalate the uprising into an armed rebellion and subsequent civil war.

The Syrian Army's siege involved tanks, helicopters, and up to 6,000 troops. More than 1,000 people were arrested and more than 244 people were killed, many of them children.

== Background ==
Several Arab Spring demonstrations occurred across Syria in the early months of 2011. On 6 March, in the city of Daraa, between 12 and 15 teenagers were arrested for making anti-regime graffiti on 22 February. The students were tortured in the Political Security cells, headed by Atef Najib, a first cousin of President Bashar al-Assad. On 18 March, protests erupted demanding the release of the imprisoned students, an end to corruption, and for greater political freedom. Security forces responded by shooting demonstrators with live ammunition, killing three people, with a fourth succumbing to their wounds the following day. This caused the protests to increase in size.

On 20 March, the third consecutive day of protests, security forces opened fire once again, killing another person–bringing the death toll to five–and injuring dozens. The protests subsequently turned violent, with demonstrators setting fire to the local courthouse and Ba'ath party headquarters, as well as the Syriatel building, owned by Rami Makhlouf–another cousin of President Assad. The central Omari Mosque was turned into a field hospital for protesters fearing potential government reprisals targeting the hospital. In order to calm the protests, the Syrian government sought to meet some of the protesters' demands by releasing the youths detained on 6 March, sacking the governor of Daraa, Faisal Khalthoum, and announcing a decrease of military service time from 21 to 18 months.

On 23 March, security forces attacked thousands of demonstrators near the Omari Mosque, killing at least 37 people. Government authorities blamed the cause of the clashes on "an armed gang", accusing it of stockpiling weapons and ammunition in the mosque and killing four people.

On 8 April, heavy clashes erupted in Daraa between protesters and security forces, in which 27 protesters were killed. According to Al Jazeera, 100 demonstrators were killed during the 22 April "Great Friday" protests in Daraa.

== Timeline ==
Between 25 April and 5 May 2011, the Syrian Army's 4th Armoured Division, led by President Bashar al-Assad's brother Maher al-Assad, besieged and raided Daraa, then a city of 75,000-300,000 people.

Monday, 25 April
According to residents, before dawn, eight tanks – their first use against protesters since 15 March – drove into the city accompanied by hundreds of soldiers, with some estimating up to 6,000 troops; the troops raided three smaller mosques and tried to capture the Omari Mosque which, since March, had served as a headquarters for demonstrators. Water, electricity, and phone lines were cut, snipers took positions on roofs of mosques––and a mix of soldiers and irregular militants armed with guns and knives searched house-to-house for protesters.
Hundreds of people were killed in the predawn raid. Corpses were lying in the streets and could not be retrieved without risk of being shot at, a local resident told media over satellite phone; "they want to teach Syria a lesson by teaching Daraa a lesson", he said. According to Arizona Daily Star, another resident said: "Let Obama come and take Syria. Let Israel come and take Syria. Let the Jews come. Anything is better than Bashar Assad." According to the Syrian Observatory for Human Rights (SOHR) and another opposition source, the second-in-command of the acting army brigade refused orders to storm the city and was arrested himself.
Tuesday, 26 April
According to human rights groups, hundreds of people in Daraa were arrested by security forces. A resident said over the telephone to Associated Press: "We are being subjected to a massacre; children are being killed".
Thursday, 28 April
Al Jazeera, citing amateur video and pictures, suggested that soldiers in Daraa were possibly being injured by their fellow soldiers for refusing to shoot at demonstrators or defecting, after which they were helped by civilians; the government officially denied "any such reports".
People in Daraa reportedly still could not leave their homes because snipers shot everything that moved, sources told Al Jazeera. Al Jazeera and the Los Angeles Times estimated that between 25 and 28 April, 42 to 50 people were killed in Daraa by security forces. According to the Los Angeles Times, a resident said that an entire army division or brigade had defected and was hiding among the people; the claim could not be verified due to foreign journalists not being granted access in Syria.
Friday, 29 April
Thousands of protesters from outside Daraa attempted to enter the besieged city and were shot at by security forces, killing 15, sources told Al Jazeera.
Daraa was now completely surrounded by tanks and armed troops, with snipers still perched on roofs and hiding in minarets of mosques, an eyewitness said to Al Jazeera over the phone. The eyewitness added that dead bodies remained rotting in the streets because collecting them was risking being shot; morgues contained 83 corpses, according to a prominent local lawyer, Tamer al-Jahamani. Activists said a total of 33 people were reported killed in Daraa on 29 April.
The government claimed it was battling "extremist and terrorist groups" in Daraa and that two soldiers were killed. 156 people were arrested, according to the Syrian military.
Saturday, 30 April
Syrian Army forces, supported by helicopters and around 20 tanks, fired tank shells and machine guns and dropped paratroopers on the Omari Mosque, capturing it; six people were killed in the operation, one of them being the son of the mosque's imam, witnesses said.
A witness told Al Jazeera that 300 soldiers had defected and joined the protesters, and that "there's no food, no medicine, no electricity, we are collecting rain water to drink".
1 May
Daraa inhabitants were still confined to their homes with no water, fuel, or electricity and with communications still down. Residents began chanting "God is Great!" to each other from their windows in the evenings, reportedly infuriating security forces.
A source in Daraa told Al Jazeera that security forces were intensifying their house-to-house searches and that hundreds of people had been arrested. The government confirmed that 149 people had been arrested.
A resident claimed tanks fired shells into the city's ancient Roman quarter.
4 May
A Syrian military official said that security forces had arrested members of an armed terrorist group in Daraa, where they had found weapons and ammunition hidden underground and in gardens.
5 May
The Damascus Center for Human Rights Studies (DCHRS) reported that 244 dead bodies of civilians, many of them children, had been transferred from Daraa to the Tishreen Military Hospital in Damascus along with 81 corpses of soldiers and army officers, most of them killed by a gunshot to the back, probably after refusing to shoot civilians, DCHRS added. An amateur video, reportedly from Daraa, showed dozens of people killed in the streets, with many apparently shot through the head. DCHRS referred to the Daraa siege as "10 days of massacres", and said army units had been using anti-aircraft weapons to attack houses in central neighbourhoods. According to the BBC, almost 1,000 men had been arrested since 30 April.
Syria's state run news agency and military officials announced that the military had "carried out" and completed "its mission in detaining terrorists" and restoring calm to Daraa and that army units had begun a "gradual withdrawal". An AFP correspondent witnessed 350 soldiers, 20 armoured personnel carriers and 20 lorries driving out of the city, while local witnesses saw a column of around 30 tanks on armoured carriers heading north from Daraa. Army units remained deployed at entrances to the city.
Trucks carrying drinking water, food, and first aid material and experts from the Syrian Arab Red Crescent and the International Red Cross delivered their first emergency relief supplies to Daraa. 150 students at Daraa University held a brief sit-in.

== International reactions ==
In response to the siege, European Union countries, including United Nations Security Council members France and the United Kingdom, asked the council to condemn the Syrian government's use of violence, but it was unclear whether council members Russia and China would support that idea. United States president Barack Obama said the U.S. was prepared to freeze Syrian officials' American assets.

== Aftermath ==
- 6 May: Residents insisted the military still remained a force in Daraa with streets largely subdued and residents afraid to leave their homes. Protesters gathered in Tafas, 12 km NNW of Daraa, and tried to enter the city but could not due to the military, according to witnesses.
- 9 May: According to the National Organization for Human Rights in Syria, the Syrian army used schools and a soccer stadium as makeshift prisons for the hundreds of arrests of recent days. A United Nations humanitarian assessment mission was not given permission to enter Syria and visit Daraa.
- 13 May: Protests erupted in and around Daraa.
- 14 May: Syrian officials announced that soldiers and tanks were being pulled out of Daraa.
- 16 May: The army allowed residents to venture outside their homes for two hours a day, a human rights activist said. On the outskirts of Daraa, two mass graves were reportedly discovered with 24 and 7 bodies, respectively. Within an hour the Syrian army reportedly took control of the larger site, started removing the corpses and confiscated mobile phones of witnesses. The story could not be independently verified, partly because foreign reporters were not granted access into Syria.
