= Assad family =

Ruling family of Syria from 1970 to 2024

Assad family عَائِلَةُ ٱلْأَسَدِ
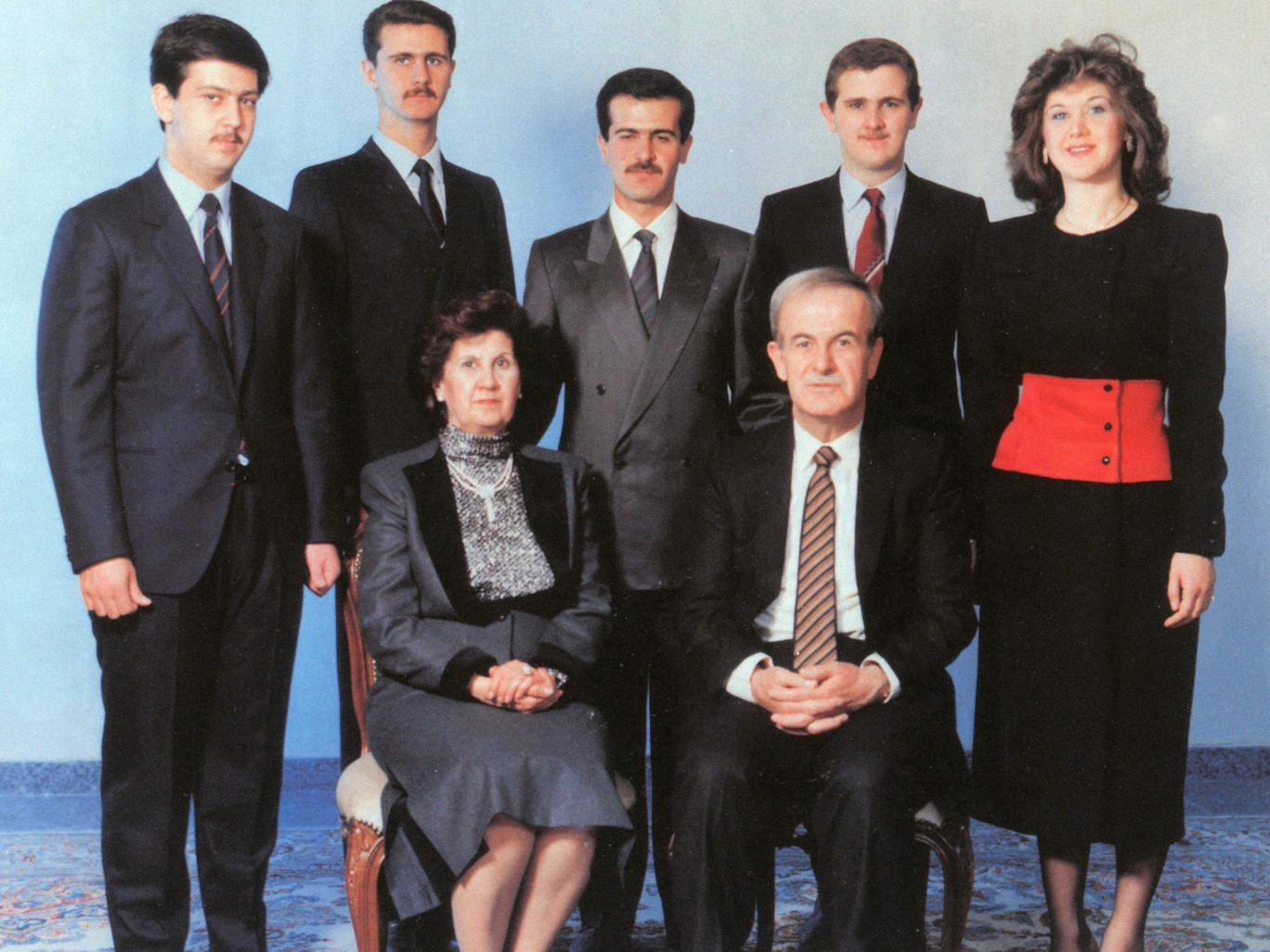
- The Assad family, c. 1993. Rear, left to right: Maher, Bashar, Bassel, Majd, and Bushra al-Assad. Front, left to right: Anisa Makhlouf and Hafez al-Assad.
- Parent family: Kalbiyya; al-Wahhish
- Country: Ba'athist Syria
- Origin: Qardaha, Latakia Sanjak, Ottoman Empire
- Founded: 1875; 151 years ago
- Founder: Ali al-Assad
- Final ruler: Bashar al-Assad
- Members: Ali al-Assad; Hafez al-Assad; Bashar al-Assad; Bassel al-Assad; Maher al-Assad; Rifaat al-Assad; Hafez Bashar al-Assad
- Connected members: Asma al-Assad; Anisa Makhlouf
- Connected families: Makhlouf, Shalish
- Traditions: Alawism
- Deposition: 8 December 2024

The Assad family (Note: Arabic: عَائِلَةُ ٱلْأَسَدِ, romanized: ʿāʾilat al-ʾAsad) ruled Syria from 1970 to 2024, spanning the rule of Hafez al-Assad and his son, Bashar al-Assad. From 1963 until the collapse of Ba'athist rule in 2024, Syria was governed by the Ba'ath Party, and under the Assad family from 1971 onward, it became a totalitarian hereditary dictatorship. The Assad family was referred to as the Assad dynasty.

The Assad family originated from Qardaha, in the Latakia Sanjak of the Ottoman Empire. They belonged to the Alawite Kalbiyya tribe. In 1927, Ali Sulayman al-Wahsh, Hafez al-Assad's father, who was born in 1875 and lived in the village of Qardaha in the Syrian coastal mountains, changed his surname from al-Wahsh, Arabic for "the savage", to al-Assad, meaning "the lion". This change was possibly connected to his social standing as a local mediator and his political activities. All members of the extended Assad family descended from Ali Sulayman and his second wife, Naissa, who came from a village in the Syrian Coastal Mountains.

The Assad family's rule began when Hafez al-Assad seized power in the 1970 coup d'état. He became president in 1971 under the Syrian Ba'ath Party following a sham election and ruled until his death in 2000. He was succeeded by his son, Bashar al-Assad, who maintained a similar grip on power until he was ousted on 8 December 2024 during a major offensive by opposition forces. During his early reign in the 1970s, Hafez al-Assad created patronage networks of Ba'ath party elites loyal to his family. Members of the Assad family established control over vast swathes of the Syrian economy, and corruption became endemic in the public and private sectors. After Hafez's death, family connections continued to be important in Syrian politics. Several close family members of Hafez also held vital positions in the government since his rise to power, an arrangement which existed until the fall of the Assad regime. The Syrian bureaucracy and business community were also dominated by members of the Assad family and individuals affiliated with them.

The Assad family is affiliated with the Alawite sect, a syncretic religious tradition with links to early Shi'ism. Since coming to power in 1970, the Assad family has traditionally relied on support from Alawite communities as an important component of its political rule. Many Alawites were appointed to key positions in the bureaucracy, security forces, military, judiciary, and other state institutions, helping consolidate the Assad family's grip on power. Hafez al-Assad built his regime into a bureaucracy that was marked by a cult of personality. Images, portraits, quotes and praises of Assad are displayed everywhere from schools to public markets and government offices. Hafez was referred to as the "Immortal Leader" and the al-Muqaddas ("Sanctified One") in official Assadist ideology. Hafez re-organised Syrian society in militaristic lines and persistently invoked conspiratorial rhetoric on the dangers of foreign-backed plots abetted by fifth columnists and promoted the armed forces as a central aspect of public life. After Hafez al-Assad's death, his son and successor Bashar al-Assad inherited the existing personality cult, with the party hailing him as the "Young Leader" and "Hope of the People". Drawing influence from the veneration of the Kim dynasty in North Korea's hereditary leadership model led by Kim Il Sung, official propaganda in Syria ascribed divine features to the Assad family and revered the Assad patriarchs as the founding fathers of modern Syria.

Opposition to the Assad family's rule coalesced into the Syrian Civil War, which began on 15 March 2011. On 8 December 2024, Bashar al-Assad was reported to have fled Damascus, signalling the end of the Assad family's rule in Syria. Following the fall of the Assad regime, Bashar al-Assad and his family, including his wife Asma al-Assad, fled to Moscow, Russia. However, remnants and loyalists of the Assad regime subsequently engaged in a conflict against the new Syrian government.

== Origin ==
The Assad family originates from Ali Sulayman al-Wahsh, Hafez al-Assad's father who was born in 1875 and lived in the village of Qardaha in the coastal Syrian mountains. The locals reportedly nicknamed him "Wahsh", Arabic for "wild beast", because he was physically strong and a good fighter. Al-Wahsh remained the family name until the 1920s, when it was changed to al-Assad, Arabic for "lion".

Because of Sulayman's reported strength and marksmanship, he was respected in his village. At the outbreak of World War I, the Ottoman governor of the Aleppo Vilayet sent troops to the area to collect taxes and round up recruits. The troops were reportedly fought off by Sulayman and his friends who were armed only with sabres and old muskets. Because Sulayman was respected, he was a local mediator between quarreling families. He was also one of the local chieftains who were the de facto rulers of the area. The chieftains from the powerful families would provide protection to their neighbours and in return they gained loyalty and respect. He lived until 1963, long enough to see his son's rise to power. He married twice and over three decades had eleven children. His first wife Sa'ada was from the district of Haffeh. They had three sons and two daughters. His second wife was Na'isa, twenty years younger than him. She was the daughter of Uthman Abbud from the village of Al-Qutailibiyah, a dozen kilometres further up the mountain. They had a daughter and five sons. Hafez was born on 6 October 1930 and was the fourth child.

Al-Assad family is affiliated with the Alawite sect, a syncretic sect with links to early Shi'ism. Since coming to power in 1970, the Assad family traditionally used sectarian loyalty from the Alawite sect as a vital component to legitimize their dynastic rule. Many Alawite loyalists were assigned to crucial posts in the bureaucracy, security forces, military, judiciary, etc., in-order to consolidate Assad family's grip on power.

== Syria under the Assad family (1970–2024) ==
=== Hafez al-Assad ===
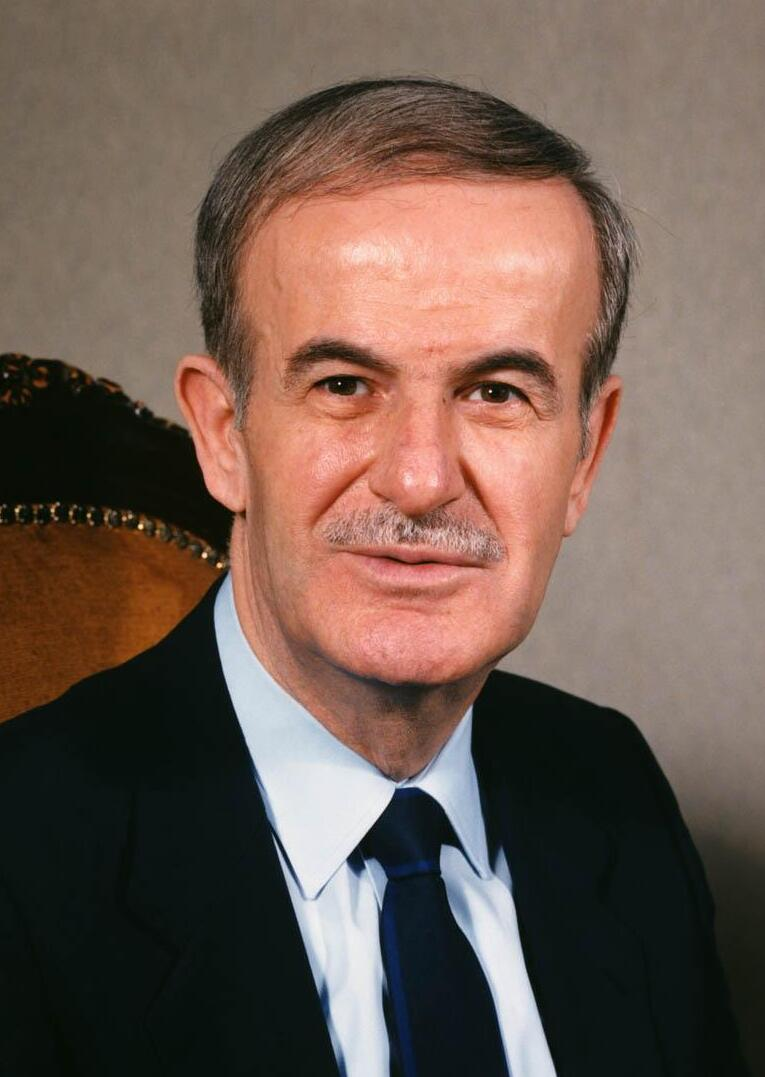
Hafez al-Assad

Hafez al-Assad was born on 6 October 1930, in Qardaha, a town in northwest Syria. He was born into a poor Alawite peasant family belonging to the Kalbiyya tribe of Alawites. Later, Assad recalled at the congresses of the Peasants' General Union: "I had a passion for threshing the harvest... But I took part in all the phases of farming..., lived your emotions and understand what your life signifies. I still have mental pictures of the injustices of the time. No matter how far the past sinks away, it is necessary to keep these images alive in our minds, not to nurse hatred against anyone but to see into them, for what we endured forms an essential part of the way we view things and of the foundation on which we build the present and the future." His paternal grandfather, Sulayman al-Wahhish, gained the nickname al-Wahhish (wild beast) for his strength.

Hafez al-Assad's parents were Na'isa Shalish and Ali al-Assad. His father married twice and had eleven children. Hafez was his ninth son and the fourth from his second marriage. Hafez al-Assad married Anisa Makhlouf and had five children: Bushra al-Assad, Bassel al-Assad, Bashar al-Assad, Majd al-Assad, and Maher al-Assad. The couple also had a daughter named Bushra, who died in infancy before 1960.

The Ba'athist regime emerged in 1963 following a coup d'état led by Alawite Ba'athist military officers. Another coup in 1966 brought Salah Jadid to de facto power, while Nureddin al-Atassi assumed the presidency. In 1970, Jadid and al-Atassi were overthrown by Hafez al-Assad during the Corrective Movement. The Assad family's rule began when Hafez al-Assad seized power in the 1970 coup d'état and became President of Syria in 1971 following a sham election held under the Syrian Ba'ath Party. Under Hafez, Ba'athist Syria became a police state that suppressed dissent. Following his death in June 2000, he was succeeded by his son, Bashar al-Assad.

=== Bashar al-Assad ===
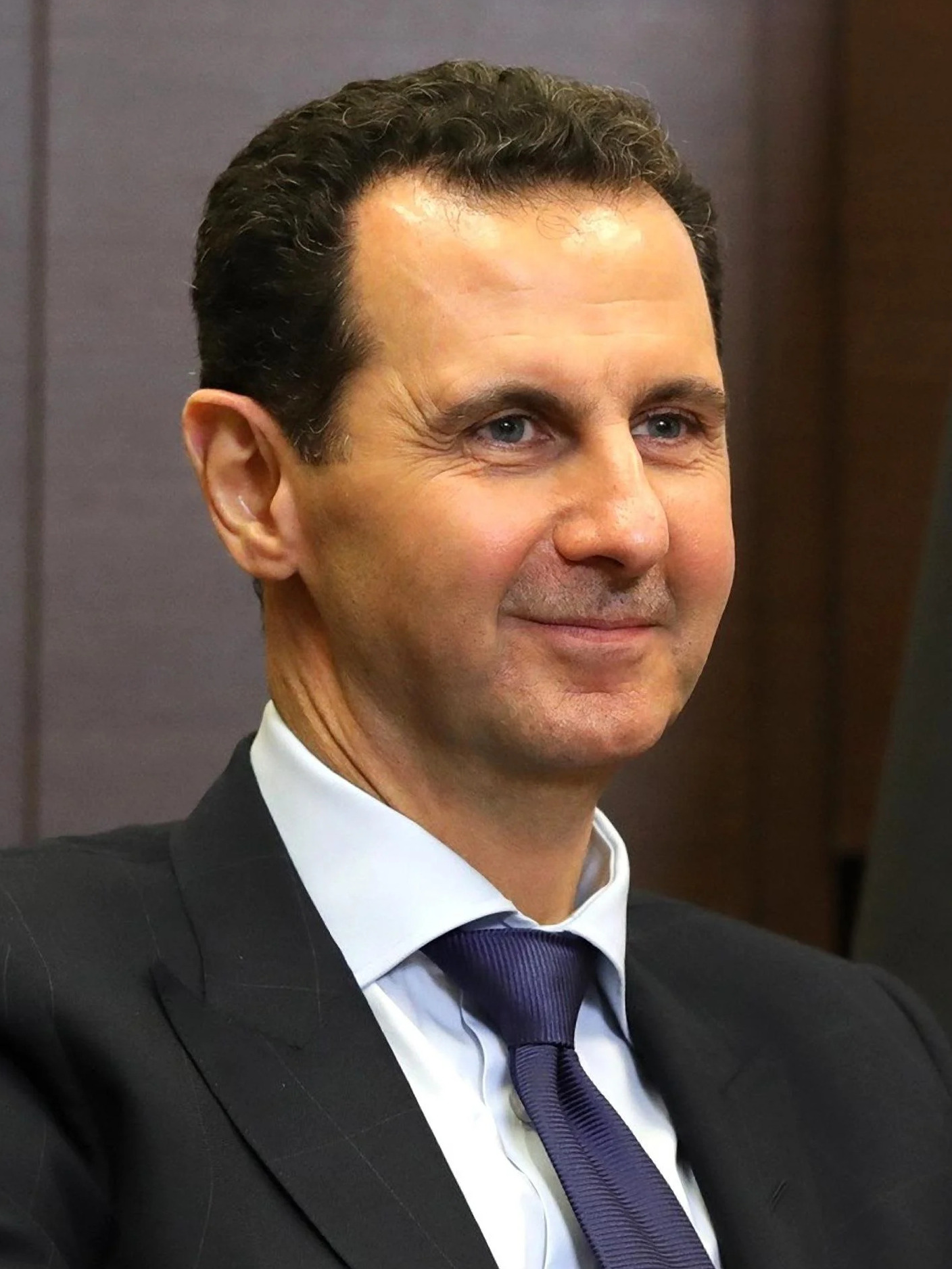
Bashar al-Assad

Bashar Hafez al-Assad was born in Damascus on 11 September 1965, as the second son and third child of Anisa Makhlouf and Hafez al-Assad. Unlike his brothers Bassel and Maher, and second sister, also named Bushra, Bashar was quiet, reserved and lacked interest in politics or the military. The Assad children reportedly rarely saw their father, and Bashar later stated that he only entered his father's office once while he was president. He was described as "soft-spoken", and according to a university friend, he was timid, avoided eye contact and spoke in a low voice.

Assad received his primary and secondary education in the Arab-French al-Hurriya School in Damascus. In 1982, he graduated from high school and then studied medicine at Damascus University. In 1988, Assad graduated from medical school and began working as an army doctor at Tishrin Military Hospital on the outskirts of Damascus. Four years later, he settled in London to start postgraduate training in ophthalmology at Western Eye Hospital. He was described as a "geeky I.T. guy" during his time in London. Bashar had few political aspirations, and his father had been grooming Bashar's older brother Bassel as future president. Shortly after Bassel died in a car accident in 1994, Bashar was recalled to the Syrian Army. State propaganda soon began elevating Bashar's public image as "the hope of the masses" to prepare the public for a continuation of the rule of the Assad dynasty.

Soon after the death of Bassel, Hafez al-Assad decided to make Bashar the new heir apparent. After the death of Hafez al-Assad on 10 June 2000, the Constitution of Syria was amended. The minimum age requirement for the presidency was lowered from 40 to 34, which was Bashar's age at the time. The sole candidate of the presidential referendum, Assad was subsequently confirmed president on 10 July 2000, with 97.29% support for his leadership. In line with his role as President of Syria, he was also appointed the commander-in-chief of the Syrian Armed Forces and Regional Secretary of the Ba'ath Party.

Bashar's presidency was marked by authoritarian rule and the suppression of political dissent. His government faced mounting criticism over corruption, human rights abuses, and its violent crackdown on the 2011 protests, which eventually led to the outbreak of the Syrian Civil War. His rule as president was a highly personalist dictatorship that governed Syria as a totalitarian police state, becoming arguably more repressive than his father. The war involved numerous international actors, with countries like Russia and Iran supporting Assad's regime, while opposition groups received backing from Western and regional powers. In November 2024, a coalition of Syrian rebels launched several offensives aimed at overthrowing Assad's government. On 8 December 2024, the Assad family's rule collapsed after rebel forces entered and captured Damascus, the Syrian capital, during the 2024 Syrian opposition offensives. Assad and his family subsequently left Syria for Moscow, the Russian capital, where they were granted asylum. In August 2026, Bashar al-Assad was convicted of war crimes and crimes against humanity by a Syrian court and sentenced to death in absentia.

== Cult of personality ==
In no other country in recent memory ... not Mao's China, nor Tito's Yugoslavia, has the intensity of the personality cult reached such extremes. Asad's image, speaking, smiling, listening, benevolent or stern, solemn or reflective, is everywhere. Sometimes there are half a dozen pictures of him in a row. His face envelops telephone poles and trucks, churches and mosques. His is the visage a Syrian sees when he opens his newspaper.

— Middle East Insight magazine

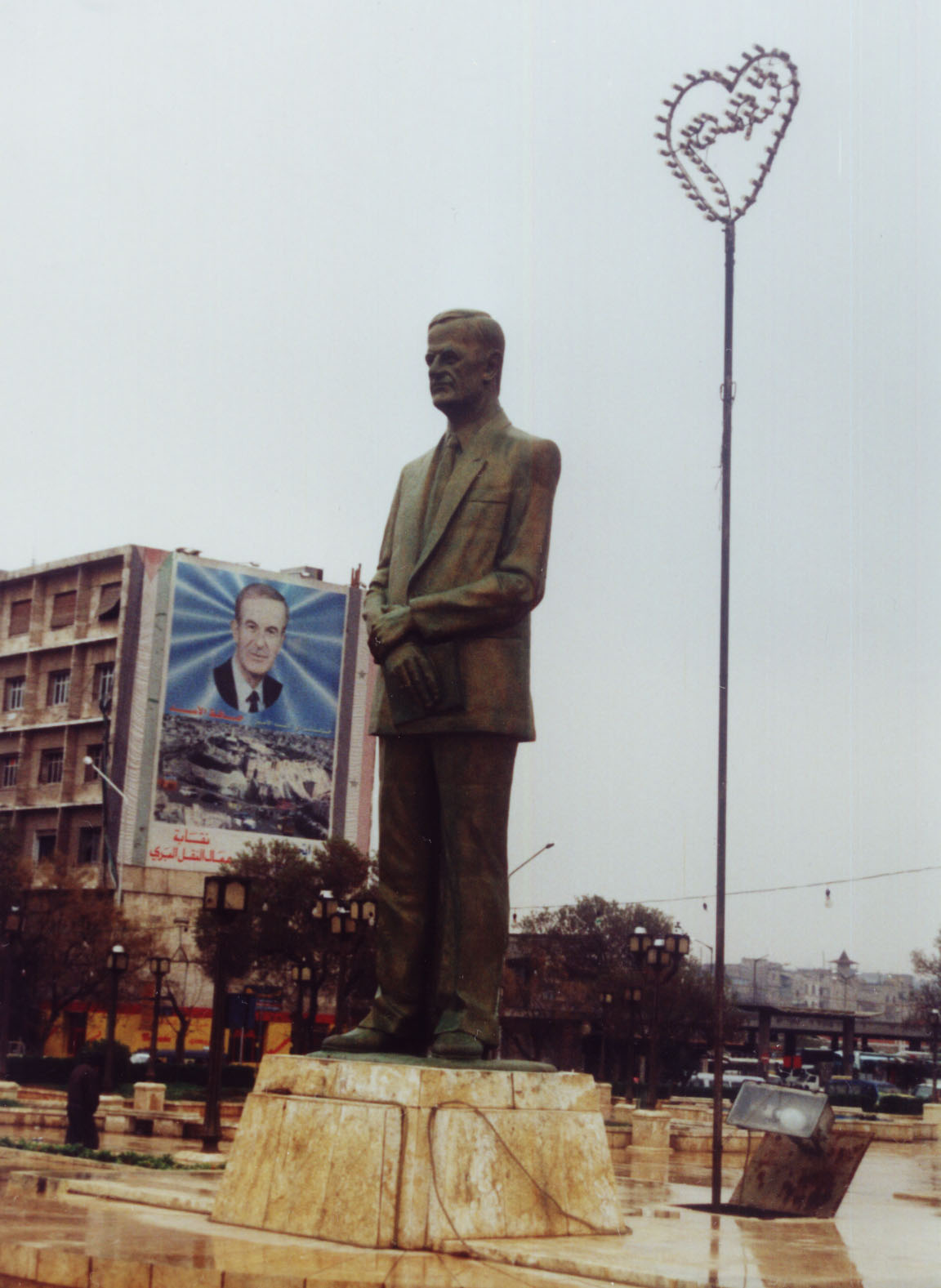
A square in Aleppo displaying the statue and portrait of Hafez al-Assad (2001)

During the 1950s, Syrian Alawites started becoming influential in the Syrian Armed Forces and Ba'ath Party. Led by Alawite military officers, like Salah Jadid, Ba'athist factions staged a series of coups during the 1960s and built up a one-party state. The party cemented its total control over the state and society by purging civilian elites, pursued an aggressive propaganda policy of "state-nationalist indoctrination" and established patronage networks based on sectarian lines to mobilise support. Following the 1970 coup d'etat that ousted his rival Salah Jadid; Hafez al-Assad developed a Stalinist-style personality cult around him; which depicted him as the father figure of Syrian nation. After Hafez's death, the personality cult was extended to his son, Bashar al-Assad. Monuments, pictures, statues, symbols and billboards of both the leaders extensively pervade Syrian society, designed to consolidate the notion of "Assad's Syria". Observers view the state propaganda efforts as a strategy for securing the compliance of the masses and identifying Syrian nationhood with the Assad dynasty.

In addition to criminalising any and all critiques of the regime; the modes of conveying messages between the state and civil society were restricted strictly within bounds of what is officially acceptable. The state further banned private political opinions critical of the regime and encouraged citizens to report relatives and friends who exhibited undesirable attitudes. The policies of economic liberalization implemented during the 2000s worsened the corruption because the chief grantees of the outcomes were businessmen and relatives close to the Assad family, such as Rami Makhlouf.

Unlike other Arab dictatorships, this feature of the Ba'ath regime and the total centralisation of power in the hands of the Assad patriarchs enabled it to instill apoliticism amongst its citizens; where the ritualisation of state slogans and symbolism had led to de facto compliance. As a result, there were far fewer avenues of free political activism for ordinary Syrians as compared to other Arab states. Until recently, political activism was shunned by many people; instead preferring the stability offered by the regime. The rise of internet and satellite channels alongside the proliferation of civil society groups and independent political activists during the 2000s increasingly began to challenge state monopoly on information, which led to rising political dissidence amongst the younger generations. Describing the hardships to raise the political consciousness of Syrian citizens by contrasting their situation with other Arab protestors, Caroline, a Syrian Christian and civic activist imprisoned by regime during the 2011–12 Arab Spring protests, states:

"Before the revolution in Egypt, people were allowed to gather, had political parties; people were exposed to political life. In Syria, we were away from politics. We were raised in Syria and our parents used to tell us that we shouldn't talk with anyone about our religion or about politics."

Since Hafez al-Assad's seizure of power in 1970; state propaganda promoted a new national discourse based on unifying Syrians under "a single imagined Ba'athist identity" and Assadism. Fervently loyalist paramilitaries known as the Shabiha (tr. ghosts) deify the Assad dynasty through slogans such as There is no God except Bashar! (Arabic: لا إله الا بشار) and pursue psychological warfare against non-conformist populations.

== Hafez's family ==
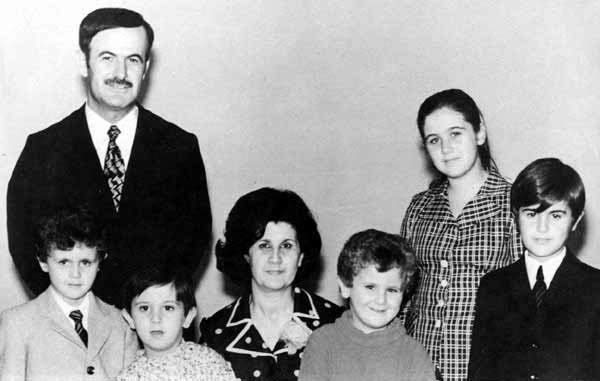
President Hafez al-Assad with his family in the early 1970s. Left to right: Bashar, Maher, Anisa Makhlouf, Majd, Bushra, and Bassel

=== Hafez al-Assad ===
- Hafez al-Assad (1930–2000). President of Syria 1971–2000.
- Anisa Makhlouf (1930–2016), wife of Hafez and First Lady of Syria.
  - Bushra al-Assad, died as an infant before 1960.
  - Bushra al-Assad (born 1960) is a pharmacist and a mother of five children, and was married to General Assef Shawkat (1950–2012), who was deputy-chief of staff of the Syrian army and the former head of military intelligence. He was killed on 18 July 2012 in a bombing in Damascus, during the Syrian Civil War.
  - Bassel al-Assad (1962–1994), was the original candidate for presidential succession but died in a car accident.
  - Bashar al-Assad (born 1965), was the President of Syria until 8 December 2024. Before Bassel's death he was an ophthalmologist. He is married to Asma al-Assad (born 1975). She was the First Lady of Syria and took a prominent public role until 8 December 2024. Before being married, she was an investment banker. They have three children (Hafez Bashar, Zein and Karim). The couple were also regarded as the "main economic players" in Syria and controlled large parts of Syrian business sectors, banking, telecommunications, real estate, and maritime industries. In August 2026, Bashar al-Assad was convicted of war crimes and crimes against humanity by a Syrian court and sentenced to death in absentia.
  - Majd al-Assad (1966–2009), was an electrical engineer with a reported history of severe mental problems. He was married to Ru'a Ayyoub (born 1976) and had no children. Majd died in Damascus on 12 December 2009 after a long unspecified chronic illness.
  - Maher al-Assad (born 1967), is the former commander of the Republican Guard, which are also known as the Presidential Guard, and the army's elite Fourth Armored Division, which together with Syria's secret police formed the core of the country's security forces. He is also a member of the Ba'ath Party central command and is said to have an aggressive and uncontrollable personality. He is married and has two daughters. He is reported to have been severely disabled in a 2012 bombing in Damascus during the Syrian civil war. He reportedly shot Assef Shawkat in the stomach in October 1999, during an argument. Maher is also known by many to be the most ruthless in the Al-Assad family. He has been linked to "overseeing a Captagon factory in al-Basa" and production centres in the Qalamoun Mountains. He is sanctioned by the US government. In August 2026, a Syrian court sentenced Maher al-Assad to death in absentia as part of a ruling against several former regime officials.

== Hafez's siblings ==
=== Jamil al-Assad ===
- Jamil al-Assad (1932–2004), parliamentarian and commander of a minor militia. Politically marginalized years before his death.
  Children:
  - Mundhir al-Assad (born 1961), was arrested in 2005 at the Beirut Airport while entering Lebanon. He was reported to have been involved in arms smuggling to the Iraqi insurgents. In 2011, the EU placed sanctions on him for being involved with the Shabbiha militia in the repression of protestors during the Syrian Civil War.
  - Fawwaz al-Assad (1962–2015), was the first real Shabiha and gave the meaning known today to the word Shabiha and the concept of Tashbeeh that is to act like a thug. He had sanctions placed on him in 2011 by the EU for being involved with the Shabbiha militia in the repression of protestors during the Syrian Civil War.
  - One daughter is married to Yarob Kanaan, whose father is Ghazi Kanaan (1942–2005), who in 2005 during his term as interior minister presumably killed himself. The Kanaans come from the Kalabiyya tribe.

=== Rifaat al-Assad ===
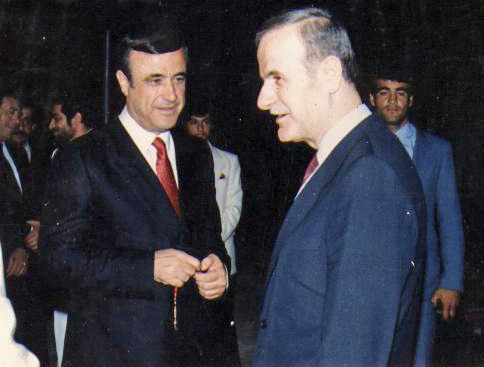
Rifaat al-Assad and Hafez in the early 1980s

- Rifaat al-Assad (1937–2026). Formerly a powerful security chief and commander of the Defense Companies, who was responsible for the 1982 Hama massacre. After attempting a coup d'état in 1987, he went into exile in France and also lived in London. He is married with four wives:
  Amira 'Aziz al-Assad (died 2019), a cousin.
  Sana' Ismail Makhluf (died 2021), from the family of Hafez's wife.
  Rajaa Bakrat, from a wealthy Sunni Damascene family.
  Lina al-Khayer, sister of Hessa bint Tarad al-Shaalan, wife of the late Saudi King Abdullah bin Abdulaziz (1924–2015).
  Rifaat has a number of children from these marriages, including:
  - Ribal al-Assad (born 1975), has lived abroad since he was nine years old; currently he lives in the United States. In an interview in 2010, he denied that his father was involved in the massacre of Hama or that his family's branch was connected to Abdul Halim Khaddam (1932–2020) or Ghazi Kanaan.
  - Somar al-Assad, supports his father actively in his opposition to Bashar.
  - Lamia, is married to 'Ala al-Fayad, the son of Shafiq Fayadh (former Syrian General).
  - Mudar al-Assad, is married to May Haydar, daughter of the Syrian multimillionaire Muhammad Haydar.
  - Tumadhir, is married to Mu'ein Nasif Kheirbek also from the Kalabiyya tribe and related to Mohammed Nasif Kheirbek (1937–2015), who is indirectly related by marriage and blood to Abd al-Halim Khaddam, Rafic Hariri (1944–2005) and the influential Homs al-Atassi family.
  - Firas al-Assad, accused his cousin, President Bashar, of killing more than 100,000 Alawites and more than half a million Syrians to stay in power.

=== Shalish family ===
- Sister of Hafez al-Assad married into the Shalish family. The family through paternal cousin General Dhu al Himma al-Shalish maintains a significant level of influence in the Bashar al-Assad government. The Shalishes are mainly active in the automobile and construction sectors.
  - General Dhu al-Himma Shalish (1951–2022), a cousin of Bashar al-Assad, was the head of presidential security and was part of the inner circle of leadership of the Bashar al-Assad government. He had sanctions placed on him by the US government for supplying weapons to Saddam Hussein and his government. On 24 June 2011, the EU sanctioned him for being involved in violence against demonstrators during the Syrian Civil War.
    - Asef Isa Shalish, nephew of Dhu al-Himma, is the manager of SES, a company that was involved in the weapons trade with Iraq and Iran.
  - Riyad Shalish, a cousin of Bashar Assad and the former director of the governmental construction organization the Military Housing Establishment, which during the 1990s he managed to transform into his own company. He made a fortune on construction and contracting deals in Syria involving large scale projects financed by other Arab states. On 24 June 2011, the EU sanctioned him for providing funding to the regime to repress protesters of the Syrian Civil War.

=== Ahmed al-Assad ===
- Ahmed al-Assad (1910–1975), was an older half-brother of Hafez from Ali's first wife Sa'ada.
  - Anwar al-Assad,
    - Hilal al-Assad (died 2014), was the president of the Syrian Arabian Horse Association. Hilal was killed on 22 March 2014, during the 2014 Latakia offensive in the battle for a border crossing at Kessab with Turkey in the north of Latakia.
      - Suleiman al-Assad, Hilal's son, was arrested in August 2015 after allegedly murdering an off-duty colonel in a 'road rage' incident in Latakia. He was sentenced to 20 years in prison but in late 2020 was released after four years. In December 2024, video of a man being lynched and hung from a crane after the fall of the Assad regime went viral with the claim that it depicted Suleiman, but this was false.
    - Hael al-Assad, was the head of the Military Police of the army's 4th Armoured Division, whose official commander is Maher al-Assad. He is also the director of the prison in which Maher al-Assad keeps his personal prisoners outside of state jurisdiction.
    - Haroun al-Assad, is an elected municipal official of the village of Qardaha.
    - Daad al-Assad, is married to General Zouheir al-Assad, who was born in 1958 and is a distant cousin. Zouheir al-Assad commanded the 90th Regiment, a unit of some 10,000 men, charged with protecting the capital.
      - Karam Al Assad, led a group of Shabiha. He and his group of shabiha led an assault against the peaceful protests during the "night of destiny". The assault ended in two deaths and dozens injured.

=== Isma'il al-Assad ===
- Isma'il al-Assad (1913–?) was an older half-brother of Hafez from Ali's first wife Sa'ada.
  - Tawfiq al-Assad,
    - Muhammad al-Assad (died 2015), another leader of the "Struggle companies". He was killed in a dispute with a powerful person over control in the al-Qerdaha area of Latakia province, on 14 March 2015.
      - Hussein al-Assad, son of Muhammad. He took over the criminal network of his father and reorganized it into a paramilitary unit, the Lions of Hussein.

=== Ibrahim al-Assad ===
- Ibrahim al-Assad, was an older half-brother of Hafez al-Assad from Ali Sulayman's first wife Sa'ada. He was married to Umm Anwar who took over the smuggling business of her son Malek.
  - Malek al-Assad was the first known smuggler in the Assad family.

About Hafez's siblings who died early—Bayat, Bahijat and an unknown sister—almost nothing is publicly known.

== Anisa's siblings ==
=== Makhlouf family ===
The Makhloufs belong to the Alawi Haddad tribe, both Hafez and Rifaat are related through marriage to the Makhloufs. The Makhlouf family rose from humble beginnings to become the financial advisor to Hafez al-Assad after the former President married Makhlouf's sister. The family headed by Mohammad Makhlouf has established a vast financial empire in the telecommunication, retail, banking, power generation, and oil and gas sectors. The net worth of the family was estimated in 2010 to be at least five billion dollars.

- Mohammed Makhlouf (1932–2020), made a fortune, both through management of state companies and in the private sector.
  - Rami Makhlouf (born 1969), is a wealthy businessman and the main owner of Syriatel. According to the Financial Times he is thought to control as much as 60% of the economy through his web of business interests that include telecommunications, oil and gas, construction, banking, airlines and retail, and he is widely seen as the business arm of the Assad government. He is regarded as Syria's wealthiest man – worth approximately 5 billion dollars. In 2020, intense dispute arose between Makhlouf and Bashar al-Assad over the issue of backtaxes; which severely damaged Assad's reputation amongst Alawite loyalists.
  - Hafez Makhlouf (born 1971), was the deputy director of the General Security Directorate and intelligence chief of the Damascus branch.
  - Iyad Makhlouf (born 1973), twin of Ihab Makhlouf, is a General Security Directorate officer. The EU, US, and UK sanctioned him for being involved in violence against the civilian population during the Syrian Civil War.
  - Ihab Makhlouf (1973–2024), twin of Iyad Makhlouf, was former Vice-Chairman of Syriatel and caretaker for Rami Makhlouf's US company. The EU sanctioned him for providing funding to the Assad government and allowing violence against demonstrators in the Syrian Civil War. He was believed to be in charge of the sniper units that were being used to shoot at protestors in the uprising. He was killed in his car on 8 December 2024, after the Fall of the Assad regime.
- Fatima Makhlouf, sister of Anisa Makhlouf.
  - Atef Najib (born 1960) is the former head of the Political Security Directorate in Deraa. The EU sanctioned him for his involvement in violence against demonstrators during the Syrian civil war. Following the fall of the Assad regime, he was arrested by Syrian security forces in rural Latakia on 31 January 2025. On 29 April 2026, Najib became the first Assad regime figure to face trial in Damascus. He was subsequently sentenced to death on 11 August 2026.
- General Adnan Makhlouf, first cousin of Anisa, former commander of the Republican Guard.
- General Talal Makhlouf, cousin of Anisa, former commander of the Republican Guard.

== Hafez's cousins ==
- Namir al-Assad, reportedly established the Shabiha with Rifaat al-Assad in the 1980s and controlled the organized smuggling networks, anchored in Latakia's port.
- Adnan al-Assad, leader of "Struggle Companies" militia in Damascus.
- Shafiq Fayadh (1937–2015), cousin of Hafez from his aunt in the village of Ayn al-Arus in Jableh. Commander of the 7th Mechanized Infantry Division 1973–78. Commander of the 3rd Armored Division since 1978. Reportedly incapacitated in 1991/92 due to a heart attack. Batatu describes him as an army corps general.

== Other relatives ==
- Numeir al-Assad, second degree cousin of Hafez's children, led the Shabiha in Latakia. He was imprisoned following a heist in 2005 at Sednaya Prison and remained there until December 2024. He was later recaptured in October 2025.
- Nizar al-Assad, is a cousin of Bashar Al-Assad. He was the head of the Nizar Oilfield Supplies company. He was sanctioned by the EU for being very close to key government officials and for financing Shabiha in the region of Latakia.
- Fawaz al-Assad, nephew of Hafez, leader of Shabiha
- Mundhir al-Assad, nephew of Hafez, leader of Shabiha
- Samer al-Assad, son of Kamal and grandson of Ismael who was a half-brother of Hafez al-Assad, runs one of several Captagon factories in Al-Bassah.
- Duraid Assad, husband of Rasha Khazem and the father of Shams Assad. Rasha and Shams Assad were smuggled into Lebanon after the fall of the Assad Regime and were arrested in the Beirut international airport because of owning a fake passport.
- Wassim al-Assad, cousin of Bashar al-Assad and a former militia leader. Arrested in June 2025 by Syrian authorities for drug trafficking and war crimes after years of leading pro-regime militias and operating in the Captagon trade. On 18 August 2026, he was found guilty for crimes including premeditated murder and torture and sentenced to death by the Fourth Criminal Court in Damascus.
- Ammar al-Assad, cousin of Bashar al-Assad. Known for early involvement in smuggling and local criminal networks in Latakia, reportedly under the protection of his uncle Jamil al-Assad.
- Fawaz Akhras is a British-Syrian cardiologist, the father-in-law of former Syrian president Bashar al-Assad, and chairman of the British Syrian Society. On 9 December 2024, the day after the fall of the Assad regime, Akhras was sanctioned by the U.S. Treasury Department for providing "support and facilitation to Bashar al-Assad in financial matters, sanctions evasion, and efforts to secure international political engagement." His daughter, Asma, married Bashar al-Assad, then president of Syria, in 2000.

== See also ==
- List of political families
- Tulfah family
- Sharaa family
