= Anisa Makhlouf =

First lady of Syria from 1971 to 2000

- أَنِيسَةُ مخلوف
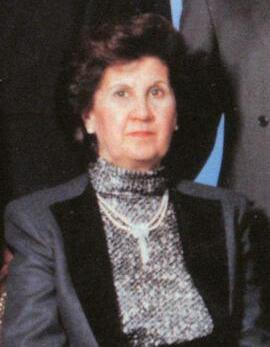
- Makhlouf in 1993

First Lady of Syria
- In role 12 March 1971 – 10 June 2000
- President: Hafez al-Assad
- Preceded by: Salma al-Hasibi
- Succeeded by: Asma al-Assad

Personal details
- Born: 5 November 1930 Latakia, Syria
- Died: 6 February 2016 (aged 85) Damascus, Syria
- Spouse: Hafez al-Assad (m. 1957; died 2000)
- Children: Bushra; Bassel; Bashar; Majid; Maher
- Parent(s): Ahmed Makhluf; Sa'da Suleyman
- Relatives: Assad family (by marriage); Ali Suleyman (uncle and father-in-law); Aziz Suleyman (uncle); Mohammed Makhlouf (brother); Rami Makhlouf (nephew)

Anisa Makhlouf (Arabic: أَنِيسَةُ مَخْلُوفٍ, romanized: ʾAnīsah Maḵlūf; 5 November 1930 – 6 February 2016) was the matriarch of the Syrian Al-Assad family, which ruled the country from 1971 to December 2024. The wife of the late Syrian President Hafez al-Assad, Makhlouf remained the Syrian First Lady from 1971 until 2000. Her son Bashar al-Assad was President of Syria from 2000 until the Assad regime was overthrown in 2024.

== Biography ==
Makhlouf was born in Latakia, Syria, to the influential Alawite Makhlouf family from Bustan al-Basha, Latakia Governorate. She was the daughter of Ahmed Makhlouf and Saada Sulayman al-Assad, Hafez al-Assad's aunt.

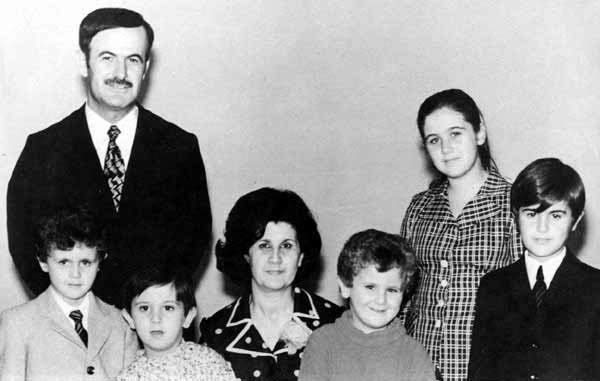
Anisa with her husband Hafez and their children in the early 1970s

She married her cousin, Hafez al-Assad, an officer of the Syrian Arab Air Force, in 1957. They had five children: Bushra (b. 1960), Bassel al-Assad (1962–1994), Bashar al-Assad (b. 1965), Majd al-Assad (1966–2009), and Maher al-Assad (b. 1967). Her marriage to Hafez al-Assad elevated the status and wealth of the Makhlouf family. Her relatives were awarded lucrative contracts within the country's banking, oil and telecommunication sectors. One nephew, Rami Makhlouf, was once believed to be the wealthiest man in Syria, with a net worth of US$5 billion, as of 2012.

According to the Tlass family, Hafez was never particularly fond of the staid and withdrawn Anisa, and had seriously considered divorcing her, or having a second wife to entertain world leaders. One whose company he enjoyed more than Anisa was the more outgoing and affable Lamia Tlass, wife of Mustafa Tlass, who was also considering divorce due to his repeated infidelity.

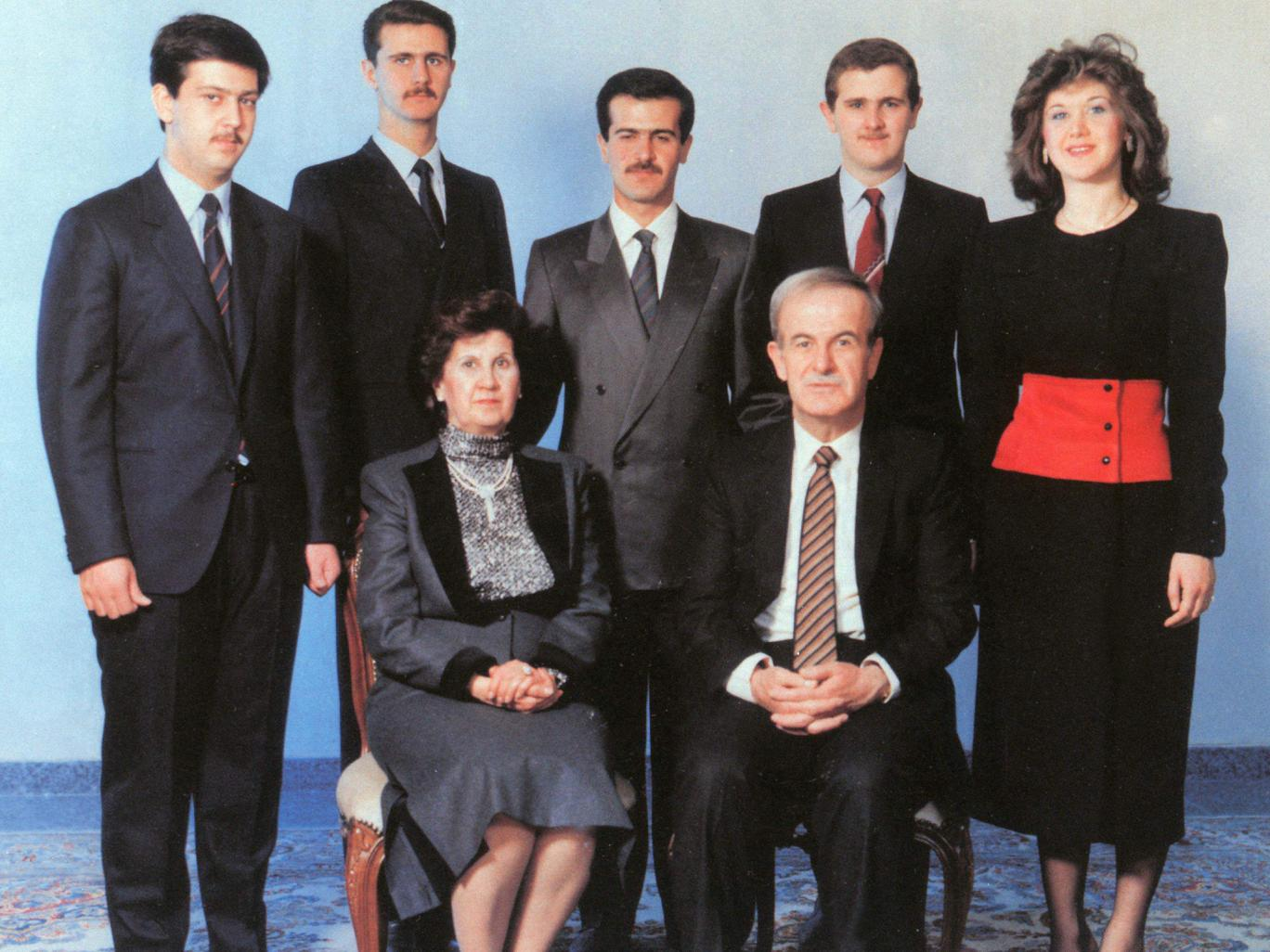
The Assad family, 1992-93

Following the death of Bassel al-Assad in 1994, Makhlouf favoured Maher al-Assad, her youngest son and a Syrian general, as a possible successor for her husband. Instead, Bashar al-Assad returned from London, joined the military, and succeeded his father as President of Syria in 2000.

The Economist described Anisa Makhlouf as "a formidable figure" within the al-Assad family and the Ba'athist government. A highly influential member of the government, she was one of the few people with whom Bashar al-Assad regularly consulted during the Syrian civil war. She is believed to have advocated for a heavy, military crackdown on Syrian protesters and rebels during the ongoing Civil War.

In 2012, Makhlouf, as well as other members of the Al-Assad family, were sanctioned by the European Union amid the country's civil war and attacks on protesters by the Syrian government.

The EU sanctions included a travel ban and the freezing of her assets. Prior to the travel ban, she had reportedly made frequent trips to Germany for medical treatments for an undisclosed illness.

== Death ==
Anisa Makhlouf died in Damascus on 6 February 2016 from undisclosed causes.

== Bibliography ==
- Dagher, Sam (2019). Assad or we Burn the Country (First U.S. ed.). New York: Little, Brown & Company. ISBN 978-0316556705.

Honorary titles
Preceded by Salma al-Hasibi	First Lady of Syria; 1971-2000	Succeeded by Asma al-Assad
