= Bushra al-Assad =

Daughter of Syrian president Hafez al-Assad (born 1960)

- بُشْرَى ٱلْأَسَدِ
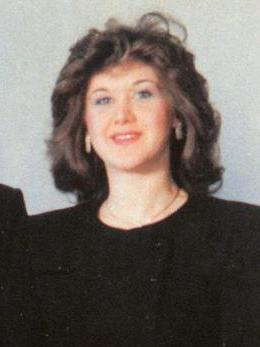
- Bushra, c. 1993
- Born: 24 October 1960 (age 66); Cairo, Egypt
- Education: University of Damascus
- Spouse: Assef Shawkat (m. 1995; died 2012)
- Children: 5
- Parents: Hafez al-Assad (father); Anisa Makhlouf (mother)
- Family: Al-Assad family

Bushra al-Assad (Arabic: بُشْرَى ٱلْأَسَدِ, romanized: Bušrā al-ʾAsad; born 24 October 1960) is the first child and only daughter of Hafez al-Assad, who was the president of Syria from 1971 to 2000. She is the sister of former Syrian President Bashar al-Assad. She is the widow of Assef Shawkat, the deputy chief of staff of the Syrian Armed Forces and former head of the Syrian Military Intelligence, who was killed in the 18 July 2012 Damascus bombing, responsibility for which was claimed by a coalition of Syrian opposition rebel groups.

As a result of the Syrian Civil War, in March 2012 she was placed on a list of Syrian government figures who were subject to European Union economic sanctions and travel bans. On 28 September 2012, it was reported that Bushra al-Assad had fled from Syria with her five children to seek refuge in the United Arab Emirates. In January 2013, Bushra al-Assad was joined by her mother Anisa Makhlouf in Dubai.

== Biography ==
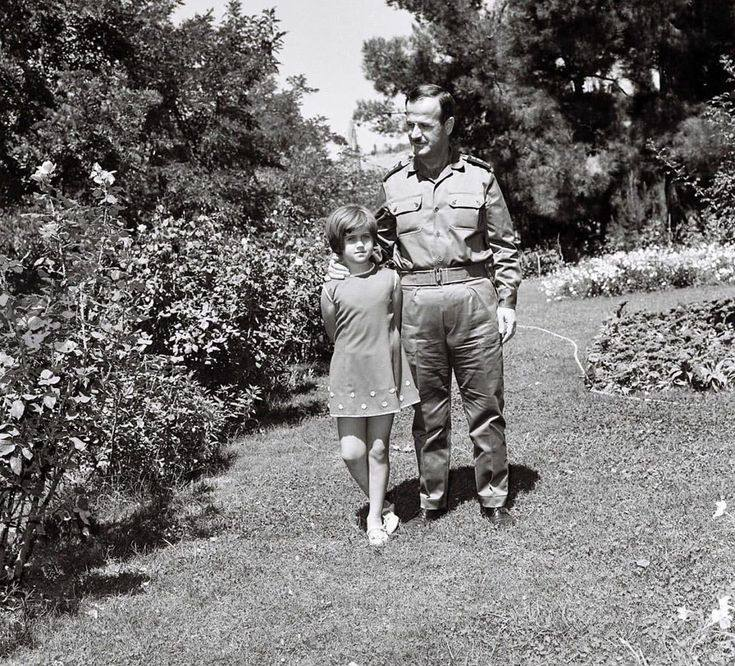
Hafez al-Assad with Bushra

Bushra was born in Cairo following her parents exile during the United Arab Republic. With her father being a major, Syrian officers who were seen as a potential threat to the regime were transferred to Egypt.

Bushra is reported to have enjoyed a close relationship with her father Hafez al-Assad and reportedly took a large role in leadership during the last years of his life, particularly as Hafez's health started failing during the 1990s. Administrative tasks and even much of the important decision-making was being delegated to Bushra, who set up her own office next to her father's in the Presidential Palace. During the late 1970s, she had accompanied her father on foreign visits and was very active in the decision-making within her father's inner circle, especially in matters relating to economic and foreign affairs, leading to speculation that she was being considered for a leadership role and even possible succession. Despite this, by the 1980s, her younger brother Bassel took on that role instead and after 1994, her second oldest brother, Bashar. In both cases, she mounted her own attempt at fighting for the succession, especially after Bashar's selection, believing him to be incompetent for the role. There has been widespread speculation that had it not been for her gender, she would have been groomed for the presidency.

Bushra attended Damascus University with Buthaina Shaaban, who became a member of the Syrian Cabinet. Despite family opposition, Bushra married Shawkat in 1995.

Since the death of her brother Bassel al-Assad in 1994, Bushra was credited with increasing influence in Syria. Bushra was also reported to have worked for her late husband to gain acceptance and recognition. Shawkat assumed key security roles within intelligence.

It was reported that Bushra disapproved of Asma al-Assad taking such a public role.

Bushra moved to the United Arab Emirates in September 2012 following her husband's death in a bomb blast. Although rebels claimed responsibility, there was some suspicion the regime of her brother may have played a role. Bushra is currently living in Dubai with her five children.

In 2019, it was reported that Bushra's daughter, Anisa, was studying spatial design at the University of the Arts London, despite being a member of a family subject to international sanctions. Later, the National Crime Agency seized the remaining £25,000 in her bank account.

== See also ==
- Assad family

== Sources ==
- Dagher, Sam (2019). Assad or we Burn the Country (First U.S. ed.). New York: Little, Brown & Company. ISBN 978-0316556705.
