= Bassel al-Assad =

Syrian military officer, engineer and politician (1962–1994)

- باسل الأسد
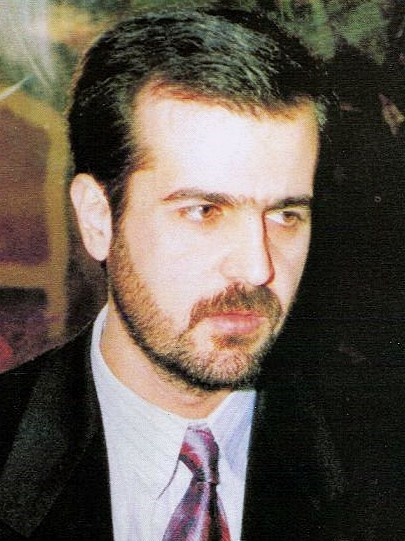
- Al-Assad, c. 1994
- Born: 23 March 1962; Damascus, Syria
- Died: 21 January 1994 (aged 31); Damascus, Syria
- Other name: The Golden Knight
- Parents: Hafez al-Assad (father); Anisa Makhlouf (mother)
- Family: Al-Assad family
- Military career
- Allegiance: Ba'athist Syria
- Branch: Syrian Arab Armed Forces (Ba'athist Syria); Syrian Arab Army
- Service years: 1980–1994
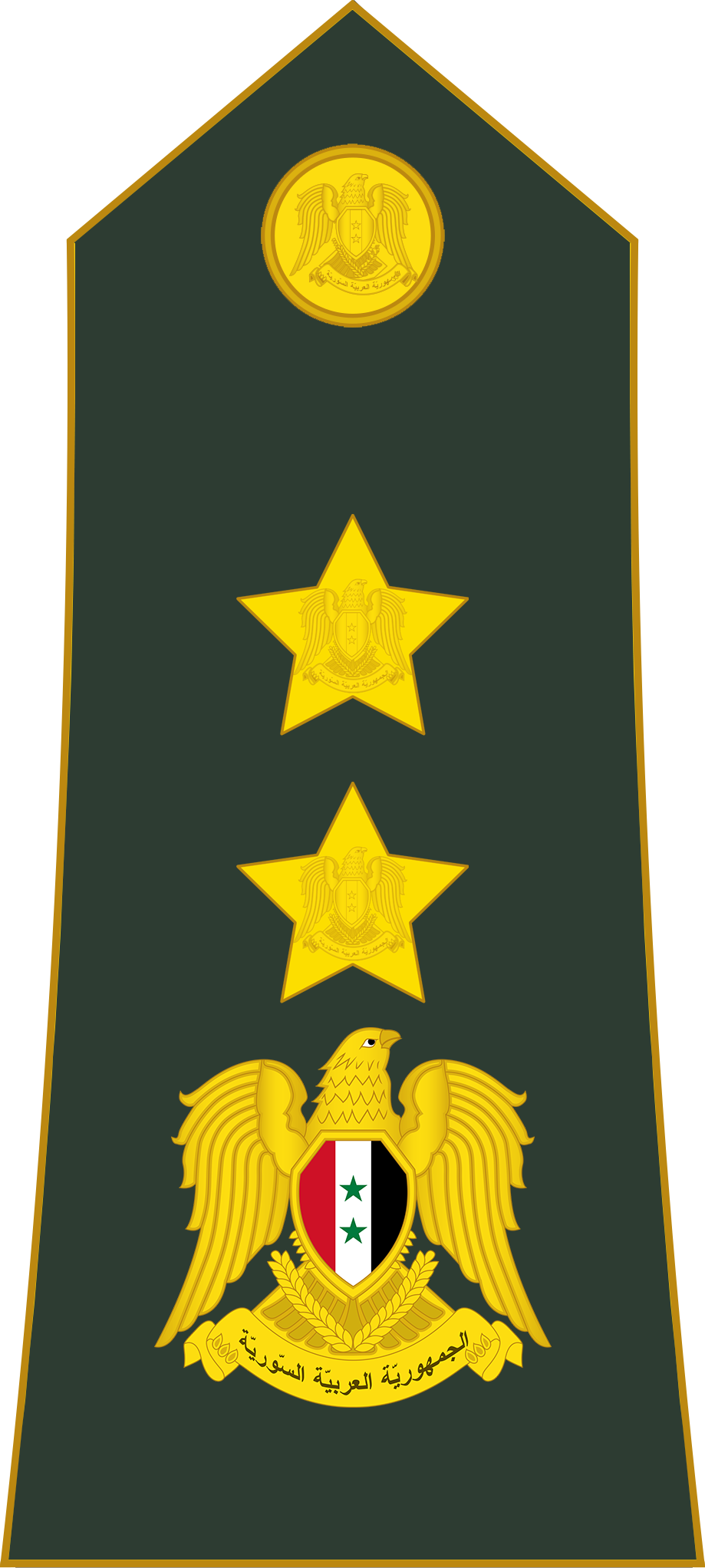
- Rank: Colonel
- Units: 14th Special Forces Division; Republican Guard
- Commands: 42nd Special Forces Regiment; 12th Armoured Battalion
- Awards: Hero of the Republic; Order of Saladin

Bassel al-Assad (Arabic: بَاسِلُ ٱلْأَسَدِ, romanized: Bāsil al-ʾAsad; 23 March 1962 – 21 January 1994) was a Syrian military officer, engineer, and politician. He was the eldest son of Syrian president Hafez al-Assad. He was expected to succeed his father as president until his death in a car crash in January 1994. After his death, his younger brother Bashar became heir apparent to the Syrian presidency and ultimately succeeded their father upon his death.

== Early life ==
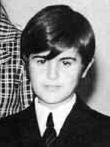
Al-Assad in the early 1970s

Bassel al-Assad was born on 23 March 1962 in the national capital city of Damascus into an Alawite family. He was the son of Hafez al-Assad, and his wife Anisa Makhlouf. He had an older sister named Bushra and three brothers named Bashar, Majd, and Maher. As a child, he was said to have bullied his brothers relentlessly.

He was trained as a civil engineer, and held a PhD in military sciences. He said about his childhood:

We saw father at home but he was so busy that three days could go by without us exchanging a word with him. We never had breakfast or dinner together, and I don't remember ever having lunch together as a family, or maybe we only did once or twice when state affairs were involved. As a family, we used to spend a day or two in Latakia in the summer, but then too he used to work in the office and we didn't get to see much of him.

== Career ==
Trained in parachuting, he was commissioned in the Special Forces and later switched to the armoured corps after training in Soviet military academies. He was rapidly promoted, becoming a major and then commander of a brigade in the Republican Guard.

After his father recovered from a serious illness in 1984, Bassel began to accompany him and he emerged on the national scene in 1987, when he won several equestrian medals at a regional tournament. The Ba'ath Party press in Syria eulogised him as the "Golden Knight" because of his prowess on horseback, being considered the pioneer of equestrian sports in the country. Bassel also had a rival equestrian competitor, Adnan Qassar, imprisoned in 1993 for beating him in a horse race; Qassar was released from Sednaya Prison in 2014. He also had a reputation for an interest in fast cars, and his friends described him as charismatic and commanding. Assad was soon appointed Head of Presidential Security. In addition, he launched the Syrian Computer Society in 1989, which would later be headed by Bashar.

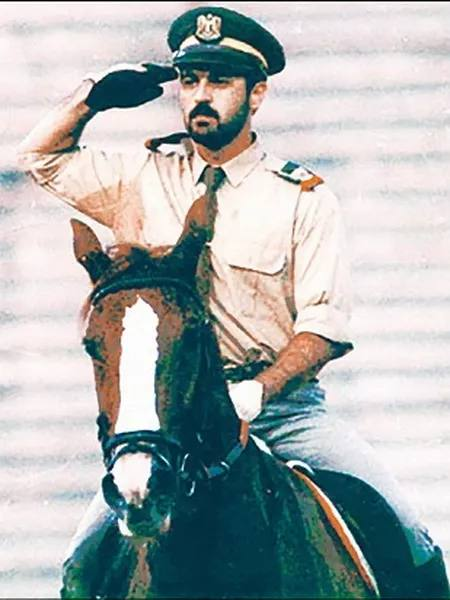
Bassel rides a horse

Originally Assad's uncle, Rifaat al-Assad, was Hafez's chosen successor; but Rifaat attempted to usurp power from Hafez while the latter was in a coma in 1984. This led to Rifaat's exile in Europe. Following the incident, Bassel was groomed to succeed his father. Hafez's efforts to make Bassel the next president of Syria intensified in the early 1990s; after Hafez's election victory in 1991 in an election where Hafez was the only candidate, the president was publicly referred to as "Abu Basil" (Father of Bassel). Bassel was also introduced to European and Arab leaders; he was a close friend of the children of King Hussein of Jordan, especially Haya bint Hussein who also enjoyed equestrianism, and had been also introduced to King Fahd of Saudi Arabia. Assad had a significant role in Lebanese affairs, and was known to Lebanese leaders of all sects. He organised a highly publicised anti-corruption campaign within the government and frequently appeared in full military uniform at official receptions to signal the government's commitment to the armed forces.

== Personal life ==
Aside from his native Arabic, Bassel was said to be fluent in French and Russian. According to leaked United States diplomatic cables, he had a relationship with a Lebanese woman, Siham Asseily, who later married Lebanese journalist and deputy Gebran Tueni.

== Death ==
On 21 January 1994, Bassel was driving his Mercedes at a high speed (author Paul Theroux reports Bassel was driving at more than 130 kilometers per hour (81 mph) through fog to Damascus International Airport for a privately chartered flight to Frankfurt on his way to a ski vacation in the Alps in the early hours of the morning). The car collided with a barrier and Bassel, not wearing a seatbelt, died instantly. Hafez Makhlouf was with him and was hospitalized with injuries after the accident; a chauffeur in the back seat was unhurt.

Assad's body was taken to Al-Asad University Hospital and then buried in a mausoleum in Qardaha, where his father's body was also later buried. On 11 December 2024, his tomb was destroyed by rebel fighters following the overthrow of his brother Bashar in the Syrian civil war.

=== Aftermath ===
Bassel Assad's death led to his brother Bashar al-Assad, who was then undertaking postgraduate training in ophthalmology in London, assuming the mantle of president-in-waiting. Bashar became president following the death of his father on 10 June 2000 and would hold the post for 24 years, until the collapse of the Ba'athist regime in December 2024.

== Legacy ==
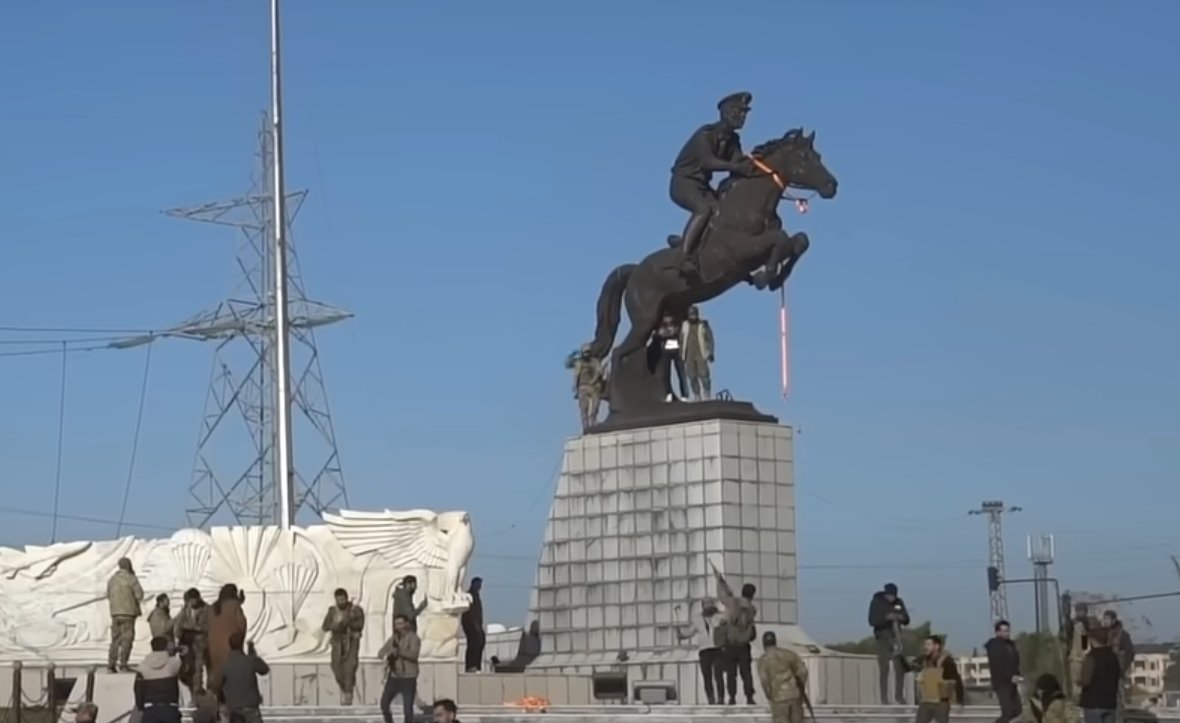
Syrian rebels toppling Bassel al-Assad's statue in central Aleppo on 30 November 2024

After his death, shops, schools and public offices in Syria closed, and the sale of alcohol was suspended in respect. He was elevated by the state into "the martyr of the country, the martyr of the nation and the symbol for its youth".

A great number of squares and streets, a new international swimming complex, various hospitals, sporting clubs, and a military academy were named after him. The international airport in Latakia was formerly named Bassel Al-Assad International Airport but the name was dropped after the fall of the Assad regime in 2024. On 17 November 2020, a museum dedicated to him was inaugurated at Latakia Sports City. The museum no longer functions after the fall of the regime.

Statues of Bassel were built in several Syrian cities; even after his death, he was often depicted on propaganda billboards with his father and brother. One such statue was erected in Chtaura, Lebanon during the Syrian occupation of Lebanon; it was dismantled and shipped back to Syria after the Syrian withdrawal in 2005. Another prominent equestrian statue of Bassel in Aleppo was toppled by rebels during the city's capture by opposition forces on 30 November 2024.
