= Hafez Bashar al-Assad =

Son of Bashar al-Assad (born 2001)

- حافظ بشار الأسد
- Born: 3 December 2001 (age 24); Damascus, Syria
- Education: Higher Institute for Applied Sciences and Technology; Moscow State University (MS, PhD)
- Parents: Bashar al-Assad (father); Asma al-Assad (mother)
- Relatives: Assad family

Hafez Bashar al-Assad (Arabic: حافظ بشار الأسد; born 3 December 2001) is the eldest son of former Syrian president Bashar al-Assad and his wife Asma al-Assad. He was regarded as a potential successor to his father before the fall of the Assad regime on 8 December 2024.

== Early and personal life ==
Assad was born in Damascus on 3 December 2001. He was named after his grandfather, former President of Syria Hafez al-Assad. In his youth, he attended a Montessori school alongside his sister and brother. They also attended a language school in the Baramkeh district of Damascus. Assad is fluent in Arabic and English. He also speaks Russian and studies Chinese.

In 2020, Assad was placed under sanctions by the U.S. Department of State in connection with previous sanctions targeting his father's regime. As a result, he is not allowed to travel to or own assets in the United States.

On December 8, 2024, when the Assad regime fell, and Hafez, along with his father, brother, and uncle Maher, fled Syria for Russia, Moscow, where the family was granted political asylum

After the collapse of the Assad regime, he posted on Twitter about a series of events detailing his family's final moments before escaping to Moscow. He said, "There was no plan, not even a backup, to leave Damascus, let alone Syria." His Twitter account was suspended after he described the family's last days in the country before the rebel takeover. After the suspension, he appeared in a short video on 12 February 2025, to address concerns about whether the detailed post on social media was from a fake account or actually his. He clarified that both the Twitter account and Telegram were his, and that he didn't have any other accounts or use any other social media platforms.

== Mathematics competitions ==
Assad has described mathematics to the media as his "childhood passion." He participated in the International Mathematical Olympiad, representing Syria, from 2016 to 2018.

- 2016 International Mathematical Olympiad (Hong Kong) – He placed 355th out of 602 overall and 4th out of 6 on the Syrian team.
- 2017 International Mathematical Olympiad (Rio de Janeiro) – He placed 528th out of 615 overall and 6th out of 6 on the Syrian team.
- 2018 International Mathematical Olympiad (Cluj-Napoca) – He placed 486th out of 594 overall and 6th out of 6 on the Syrian team.

Assad's participation in the International Mathematical Olympiad has been criticized by some outside observers, viewing his inclusion on the Syrian team as the result of nepotism. However, this was denied by a representative of the Syrian government, claiming that Assad qualified in fair competition for a space on the team.

== Public life ==
Assad received media attention in 2013 when a Facebook account attributed to him posted a criticism of the U.S. military in the wake of the Ghouta chemical attack. However, both Syrian opposition figures and outside media sources questioned whether the since-deleted account was authentic.

During the 2017 IMO, Assad was interviewed by Brazilian newspaper O Globo. When asked if his father is a dictator, he defended him saying: "I know what kind of man my father is. People say a lot of things, many are blind. But that's not reality". He also took his father's side in conflict, saying: "It's not a civil war, it's people taking over our home. It's a war against the people. The population and the government are united against the invaders who are taking over the country."

== Education ==
In 2015, Assad received his primary education certificate from Naeem Maasarani School in Damascus with a final grade of 2,983 out of 3,100.

In 2018, Assad received his secondary education certificate from Sawa and Montessori School in Damascus with a final grade of 2,672 out of 2,900.

In 2016, it was announced that Assad would complete his higher education in Russia. Before he matriculated to Moscow State University, he studied for a period of time at the Higher Institute for Applied Sciences and Technology in Damascus. In 2023, Assad graduated with a master's degree in mathematics from the Faculty of Mechanics and Mathematics of Moscow State University with honors. He graduated on an accelerated schedule, completing his final two years in a single year. He wrote his thesis on the topic of number theory. In November 2024, he successfully defended his doctoral dissertation on number theory, titled Arithmetic Questions of Polynomials in Algebraic Number Fields, at Moscow State University. Assad dedicated his thesis "to the martyrs of the Syrian Arab Army, without whose selfless sacrifices none of us would exist".
