= 1971 Syrian presidential election =

- 12 March 1971
- Turnout: 95.30%
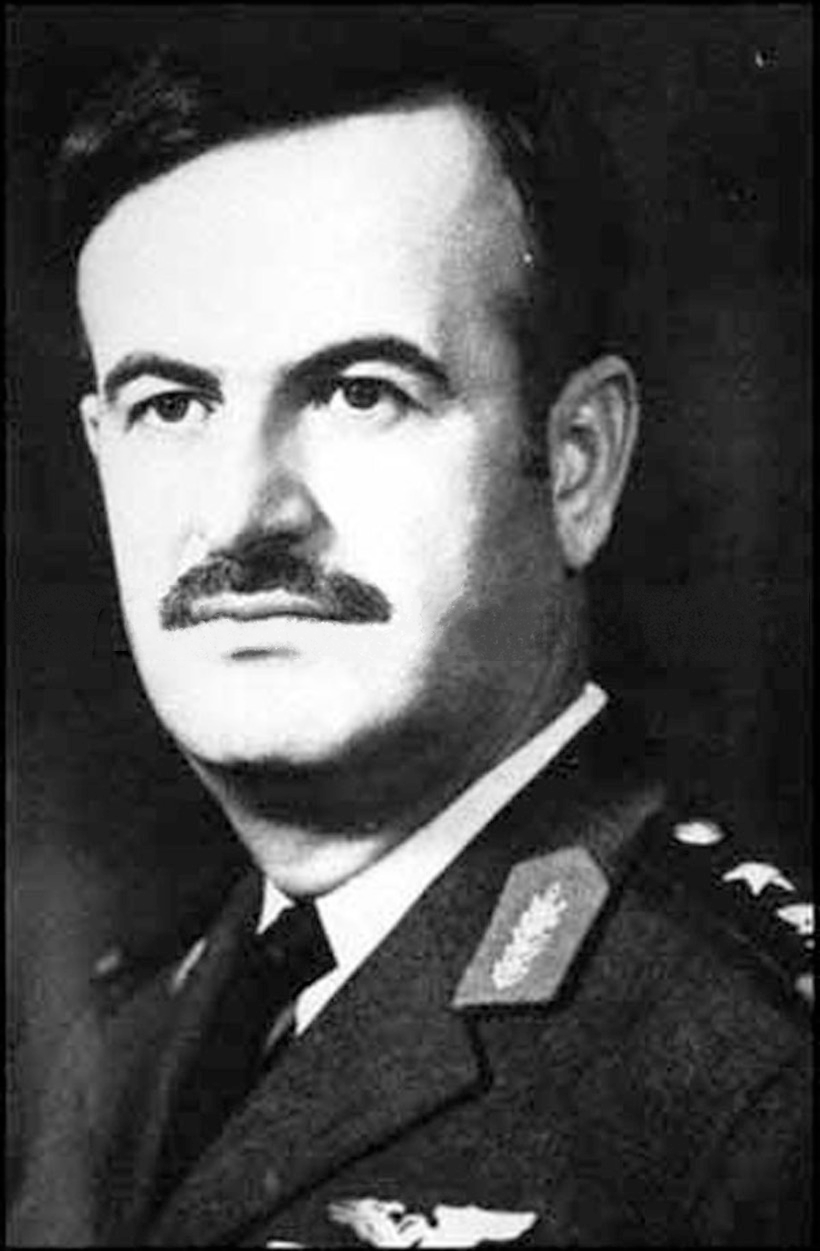
Nominee	Hafez al-Assad
Party	Ba'ath Party
Popular vote	1,919,609
Percentage	99.20%
- Results by governorate Assad: 90–100% Election not held
President before election
Ahmad al-Khatib
Ba'ath Party
Elected President
Hafez al-Assad
Ba'ath Party

Presidential elections were held in Syria on 12 March 1971. There was only one candidate, Hafez al-Assad, with voters asked to approve or reject his candidacy. A reported 99% of voters voted in favour, with a turnout of 95%.

These were the first elections to ever take place in Ba'athist Syria, which was established in 1963 following the 1963 coup that brought the Ba'ath Party to power. The elections marked the beginning of the Assad dynasty, who seized power in November 1970; the Ba'ath Party and Assad family would rule Syria for the next six decades until the regime was overthrown by anti-Assad rebels in 2024.

== Results ==
Candidate	Party	Votes	%
Hafez al-Assad	Ba'ath Party	1,919,609	99.20
Against		15,480	0.80
Total		1,935,089	100.00
Valid votes		1,935,089	99.96
Invalid/blank votes		714	0.04
Total votes		1,935,803	100.00
Registered voters/turnout		2,031,306	95.30
Source: Nohlen et al.
