= Dhu al-Himma Shalish =

Syrian official (1951–2022)

Dhu al-Himma Shalish ذو الهمة شاليش

Head of Presidential Security
- President: Bashar al-Assad
- Prime Minister: Riyad Farid Hijab; Wael Nader al-Halqi

Personal details
- Born: 1951 Qardaha, Syria
- Died: May 14, 2022 (aged 71)
- Party: Ba'ath Party
- Relations: Riyad Shalish (brother)

Military service
- Allegiance: Ba'athist Syria
- Rank: Major General

Dhu al-Himma Shalish (Arabic: ذو الهمة شاليش; 1951 – May 14, 2022) was the first cousin of former Syrian President Bashar al-Assad and head of presidential security. He was part of Bashar al-Assad's inner circle.

== Background ==
Dhu al-Himma Shalish was born in 1951, in the town of Qardaha in Latakia to an Alawi family. His mother was the sister of Syria's former president Hafez al-Assad. The Shalishs through Dhu al-Himma maintain a significant level of influence in the Syrian government and economy and are comparatively as influential as the Makhloufs, the family of Hafez al-Assad’s wife.

Shalish was the brother of Riyad Shalish, who is the director of the government construction firm the Military Housing Establishment, which during the 1990s he managed to transform into his own company. He subsequently made a fortune on construction and contracting deals in Syria involving large-scale projects financed by other Arab states. The Shalishs were also reported to have engaged in a number of illicit activities including smuggling and money laundering.

== Iraqi activity ==
In June 2005, Dhu al-Himma and his nephew, Asef Isa Shalish, and their company, SES International Corporation, were sanctioned by the United States government for procuring defense-related goods for Saddam Hussein in violation of former sanctions against Iraq. According to the United States Treasury Department, SES helped the former Iraqi government access weapons systems by issuing false end-user certificates to foreign suppliers that listed Syria as the final country of destination.

SES International then transshipped the goods to Dhu al-Himma Shalish and Assef Shawkat, Bashar al-Assad’s brother in law, prior to the Iraqi war also possibly helped the Iraqi government transport its weapons of mass destruction out of the country and into Syria for storage. The Syrian defector Nizar Nayuf reported that Iraq’s weapons of mass destruction were moved with the help of the Russians and Syrians to tunnels inside Syria.

== Syrian civil war ==
Dhu al-Himma Shalish played an important role in containing the unrest during the Syrian civil war. On 24 June 2011, the European Union sanctioned him along with a number of other Syrian government officials for their role in the violent repression of protesters during the early stages of the civil war. His influence within the president's inner circle was believed to have increased since the beginning of the uprising. It was reported that he was a key financier and organiser of the pro-Assad militia groups known as the shabiha.

Before the Syrian civil war, Shalish and his immediate family were poorly regarded by the Assads but they were reportedly elevated into the inner circle because they were willing to do the dirty work and because there were only so many family members.

Prior to 2019, Shalish acted as the head of the presidential security for Bashar al-Assad, but on June 12 of that year he was removed from his position and put under house arrest, as part of the Assad regime's internal power struggles. Shalish died at his home on May 14, 2022. A cause of death was not specified, but some of his supporters protested outside of his home, alleging foul play.
