= Asma al-Assad =

First Lady of Syria from 2000 to 2024

- أسماء الأسد
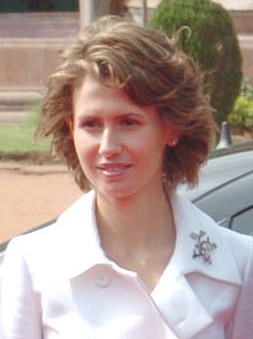
- Assad in 2008

First Lady of Syria
- In role 13 December 2000 – 8 December 2024
- President: Bashar al-Assad
- Preceded by: Anisa Makhlouf
- Succeeded by: Latifa al-Droubi^{[a]}

Personal details
- Born: Asma Fawaz Akhras; 11 August 1975 (age 51) London, England
- Citizenship: Syria; United Kingdom (Note: Depsite holding British citizenship, she is barred from entering the country with UK foreign secretary David Lammy citing sanctions against her)
- Spouse: Bashar al-Assad (m. 2000)
- Children: 3, including Hafez
- Parents: Fawaz Akhras (father); Sahar Otri (mother)
- Relatives: Assad family (by marriage)
- Education: King's College London (BSc)
- Role vacant until 29 January 2025.

Asma Fawaz al-Assad (Arabic: أسماء فواز الأسد; née Akhras; born 11 August 1975) is the former first lady of Syria, married to Bashar al-Assad. Her husband was president from 2000 until he was overthrown on 8 December 2024. Born and raised in London, to Syrian parents, she holds dual British and Syrian citizenship. She became first lady when she married al-Assad on 13 December 2000, shortly after he became president. Since the fall of her husband's regime, she and Bashar have been living in self-imposed exile in Russia.

Asma Fawaz Akhras graduated from King's College London in 1996 with a bachelor's degree in computer science and French literature. She had a career in investment banking and was planning to begin an MBA at Harvard University when she married Bashar al-Assad in December 2000. She resigned from her job in investment banking following the wedding and remained in Syria, where their three children were born. As first lady, she played a major role in supporting government organisations involved with social and economic development as part of a reform initiative halted due to the outbreak of the Syrian civil war.

Along with her husband, Assad was considered to be one of the "main economic players" in Syria, controlling large parts of Syrian business sectors, banking, telecommunications, real estate and maritime industries. As a result of the Syrian civil war, Assad was subject to economic sanctions relating to high-level Syrian government officials, making it illegal in the European Union (EU) to provide her with material and financial assistance, for her to obtain certain products, and curtailing her ability to travel within the EU. In the UK, she was a part of a preliminary inquiry within the War Crimes unit of the Metropolitan Police with allegations involving the "systematic approach to the torture and murder of civilians, including with the use of chemical weapons" and incitement of terrorist acts.

== Early life and education ==
Asma Fawaz Akhras was born on 11 August 1975 in London to Syrian parents Fawaz Akhras, a cardiologist at the Cromwell Hospital, and his wife Sahar Akhras (née Otri), a retired diplomat who served as First Secretary at the Syrian Embassy in London. Her parents are Sunni Muslims from the city of Homs. She holds British citizenship.

She grew up in Acton, London, where she went to Twyford Church of England High School and later a private girls' school, Queen's College, London. She graduated from King's College London in 1996 with a Bachelor of Science degree in computer science.

== Finance career ==
After graduating from King's College London, she started work as an economics analyst at Deutsche Bank Group in the hedge fund management division with clients in Europe and East Asia. In 1998, she joined the investment banking division of J.P. Morgan where she worked on a team that specialised in biotechnology and pharmaceutical companies. She credits her banking experience for her "analytical thinking" and ability to "[understand] the business side of running a company."

She was planning to pursue an MBA at Harvard University until, on holiday at her aunt's in Damascus in early 2000, she was reacquainted with Bashar al-Assad, a family friend.

== First Lady of Syria (2000–2024) ==
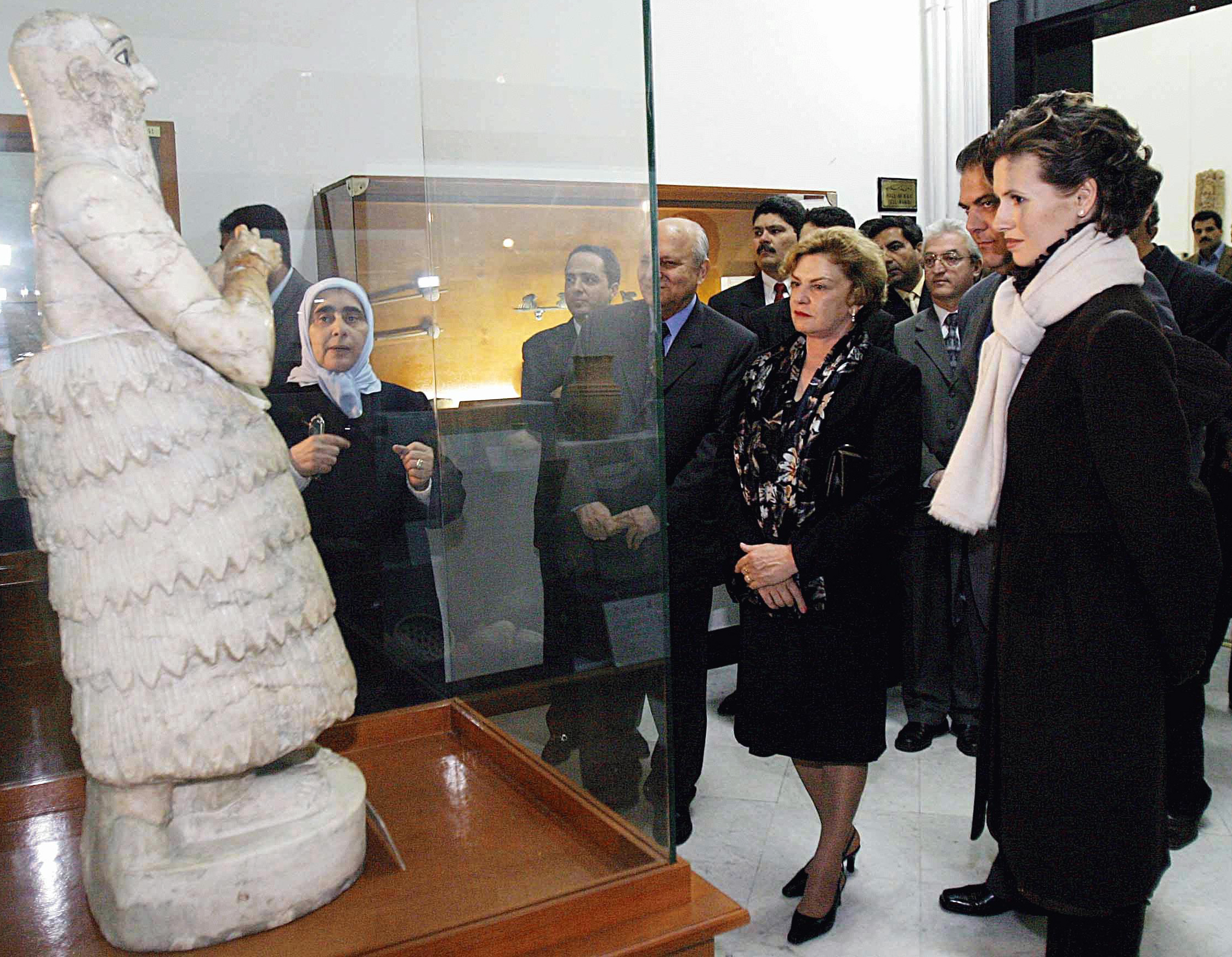
Assad and the First Lady of Brazil, Marisa Letícia Lula da Silva, looking at the statue of Iku-Shamagan in the National Museum of Damascus, 3 December 2003

After Hafez al-Assad's death in June 2000, his son Bashar took over the presidency. Asma moved to Syria in November 2000 and married Bashar in December of that year. The marriage surprised many since there had been no media reports of their dating and courtship prior to the wedding. Many interpreted the union as a reconciliation and sign of progression towards a reformative government as Asma grew up in the United Kingdom and represents the Sunni majority, unlike the Alawite Bashar.

After the wedding, Assad travelled throughout Syria to 100 villages in 13 of the 14 Syrian governorates to speak with Syrians and learn where she should direct her future policies. She went on to create a collection of organisations that functioned under the charity sector of the government, referred to as the Syria Trust for Development. Due to this work, she earned a spot as one of the Middle East 411 Magazine's "World's Most Influential Arabs."

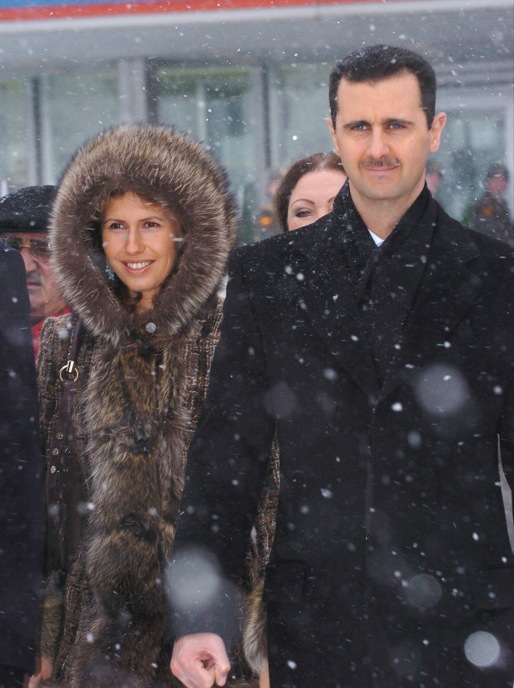
Asma and Bashar al-Assad during a trip to Moscow, Russia, 27 January 2005

According to media analysts, Assad focused on women's rights and education but ultimately stood by her husband on political matters. The United Nations Development Programme spent US$18 million to help organise a complex set of reform initiatives showing the Syrian government was working toward a more modern and progressive form of government, a key part of which was helping to create "a reformer's aura" for Assad, highlighting her participation in the Syria Trust for Development until the programme was suspended as the country descended into civil war. As a Sunni Muslim by birth, Assad's leading role was also important for the view of the Syrian government and President among the Sunni majority of Syria.

=== "A Rose in the Desert" controversy and retraction ===
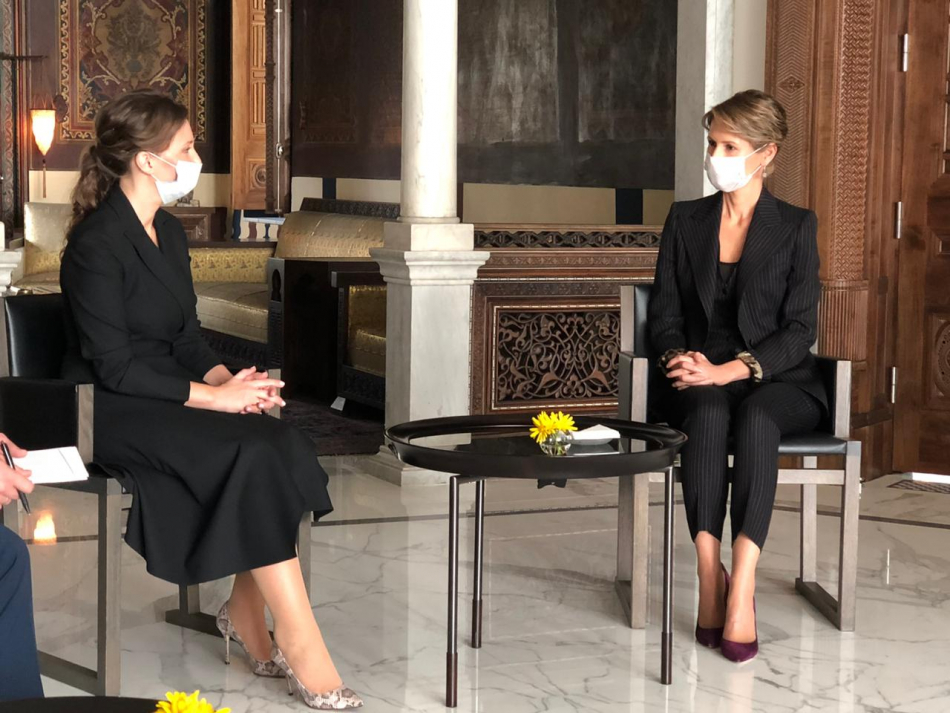
Asma al-Assad (right) in 2020

In February 2011, Vogue published "A Rose in the Desert", a flattering profile of Assad by veteran fashion writer Joan Juliet Buck that was described as Orientalist. For example, the article stated that Syria was "a place without bombings, unrest, or kidnappings" because of the Assad regime's intense surveillance of citizens and foreigners (forced disappearances by the Syrian government were not discussed) and described the Assad family as "wildly democratic".

Facing controversy since its publication, the article was removed from Vogue's website without editorial comment that spring. Responding to media inquiries about the disappearance of Assad's profile, Vogue's editor stated that "as the terrible events of the past year and a half unfolded in Syria, it became clear that [Syria's] priorities and values were completely at odds with those of Vogue." The New York Times reported that the Assad "family paid the Washington public relations firm Brown Lloyd James $5,000 a month to act as a liaison between Vogue and the first lady, according to the firm."

In July 2012, Buck wrote another article for The Daily Beast giving an extremely critical account of Assad. In another article in The Telegraph published in August 2012, Buck harshly criticised Asma al-Assad for being compliant in the regime's war-crimes and described her as the "First Lady of Hell". Stating that the title "A Rose in the Desert" was not her choice, Buck commented on her Vogue article:

I didn't want to write the piece. But I always finished what I started. I handed it in on 14 January, the day President Ben Ali fled Tunisia. 'The Arab Spring is spreading,' I told American Vogue on 21 January. 'You might want to hold the piece.' They didn't think the Arab Spring was going anywhere, and the piece was needed for the March 'Power Issue'... On 25 February, as Libyan protesters demanded an end to Gaddafi, my piece on Asma al-Assad went online at vogue.com. They had excruciatingly titled it 'A Rose in the Desert'.

=== Syrian civil war ===
Assad was criticised for remaining silent at the beginning of the Syrian uprising. She issued her first official statement to the international media in February 2012, nearly a year after the first serious protests. That February, she sent an email to The Times, writing: "The President is the President of Syria, not a faction of Syrians, and the First Lady supports him in that role." The email also described her continued support for charities and rural development activities and related that she comforts the "victims of the violence".

On 23 March 2012, the European Union froze her assets and placed a travel ban on her and President Bashar al-Assad's other close family members as part of escalating sanctions against the Syrian government. Assad remained able to travel to the UK because of her British citizenship.

On 16 April 2012, Huberta von Voss Wittig and Sheila Lyall Grant, the wives of the German and British ambassadors to the United Nations, released a four-minute video asking Assad to stand up for peace and urge her husband to end the bloodshed in her country.

Assad had not been seen in public since the July 2012 bombing of the Syrian Military Intelligence Directorate, leading to press speculation that she had fled Damascus or the country. She made a public appearance at the Damascus Opera House for an event called "Mothers' Rally" on 18 March 2013, refuting the rumours. She made another public appearance in October 2013 and again refuted rumours of her departure, stating: "I was here yesterday, I'm here today and I will be here tomorrow."

By 2020, observers noted that Assad had begun to extend her influence within the Syrian government. Her charity Syria Trust for Development had become active again, and she began to move members of that body into more influential positions, including the election of activists from the charity and development sector during the 2020 Syrian parliamentary election. Nine activists consequently won seats in the Syrian parliament, all of whom were connected to her "Syrian Trust and Development" charity. As a result, she gained a political foothold in the parliament, indicating at the time that she was “likely to continue to play a key role in the Syrian political arena." Tensions with Rami Makhlouf led him to accuse Assad of stealing "Alawite money" and he later warned her husband, Bashar al-Assad, of potential discontent amongst the Alawite elites.

In March 2021, the War Crimes unit of London's Metropolitan Police opened an investigation into allegations that Assad incited and encouraged terrorist acts during the war. It was reported that Assad pursued talks with powerful Alawite figures to portray herself as a more amenable alternative in case of Bashar al-Assad's resignation. Commenting on her future ambitions to expand her political clout, Ayman Abdelnour, a former regime insider and President of Syrian Christians for Peace organization, described her trajectory:

At first, she wasn't treated as part of the family... She is from Homs, and a Sunni, and her Arabic wasn't good, so she wasn't allowed to speak to the media in case she makes mistakes. They didn't even let her have the title first lady. But after 2013 she backed her husband fully. Her position matched whatever he was doing militarily: bombings, killings and torturing.

In late November 2024, she fled Syria to Russia along with her three children, following the 2024 Syrian opposition offensives and preceding the ousting of her husband in December. Despite Assad retaining British citizenship, UK foreign secretary David Lammy confirmed that she was no longer welcome in the United Kingdom, citing sanctions against her.

== Personal life ==
=== Marriage and family ===
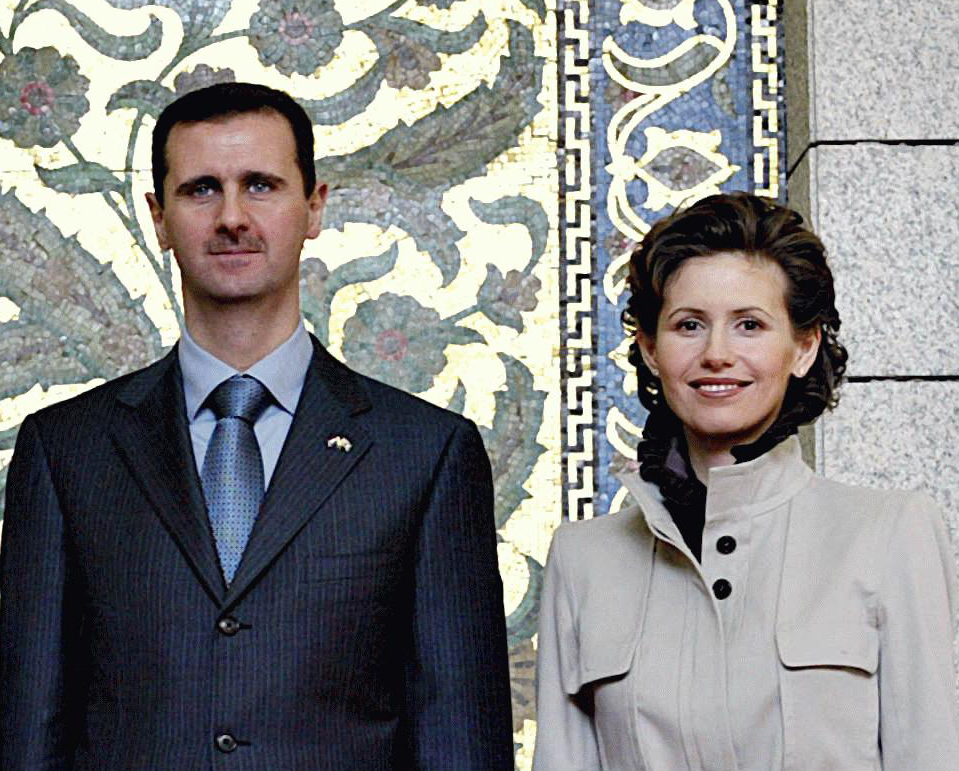
Assad with her husband Bashar al-Assad in 2003

Assad first met her future husband during childhood holidays in Syria, but they became closer when he moved to London in 1992 to train as an ophthalmologist at the Western Eye Hospital. They married following his accession to power in 2000.

Assad and her husband have three children. Their first child, a son named Hafez, named after her father in-law, was born in December 3 2001, followed by a daughter in October 5 2003, and their second son in December 16 2004. In January 2013, Bashar stated in an interview that Asma was pregnant; however, there were no later reports of them having a fourth child.

On 23 December 2024, media outlets cited a Turkish source reporting that Asma had filed for divorce from Bashar during their exile in Moscow. The reports were later denied by the Russian government and Asma's father.

=== Health ===
On 8 August 2018, it was announced that she had begun treatment for early stage breast cancer. On 4 August 2019, Assad publicly stated that she had fully recovered and was officially cancer-free.

On 8 March 2021, during the COVID-19 pandemic in Syria, Assad and her husband both tested positive for COVID-19, according to the presidential office. They were reported to be in good health with "minor symptoms." On 30 March, it was announced that both had recovered and tested negative for the disease.

On 21 May 2024, the Syrian presidency announced that Assad had been diagnosed with acute myeloid leukemia, following the emergence of several symptoms and clinical signs, which forced her to refrain from direct work and participation in events as part of the treatment plan. In late December 2024, after the overthrow of her husband, reports revealed Asma's leukemia had returned after a brief remission, and she was in critical condition, isolated under close medical care. In December 2025, The Guardian reported that Assad's health had recovered after undergoing experimental therapy under the supervision of Russia's security services.

=== Interests ===
Assad is reported to enjoy theatre, opera and visiting the cinema.

== Notes ==
Honorary titles
Preceded by Anisa Makhlouf	First Lady of Syria; 2000–2024	Succeeded by Latifa al-Droubi (2025)
