= Kalbiyya =

Alawite tribe in Syria

- Alawite Syrian tribal confederation
- Kalbiyya tribal areas, northwestern Syria
- Ethnicity: Arab
- Location: Nusayri mountains region, Syria
- Population: 480,000 (est. 2011)
- Branches: Rashawneh; Junaydi; Al-Nawasireh; Al-Jurud; Al-Qarahilah
- Language: Levantine Arabic (Alawite dialect)
- Religion: Alawite

The Kalbiyya (Arabic: الكلبية), or Kalbi or Kelbi tribe is one of four tribes, or tribal confederations, of the Alawite community in Syria. Appearing in historical sources from the 16th century, the Kalbiyya came to prominence when Hafez al-Assad, the son of a Kalbiyya tribal leader, seized power in Syria in a coup in 1970. Assad ruled Syria as a dictator for 30 years and ensured that power was concentrated in the hands of members of the Kalbiyya tribe, a policy which his son, Bashar al-Assad, continued for another 24 years until overthrown in 2024. The Kalbiyya population mainly live in the Latakia Governorate in north west Syria.

== Background ==
The Kalbiyya are a tribe, or tribal confederation, of the Alawite community of northwestern Syria. Also known as Nusayris or Alawis, the Alawites are a prominent mystical religious sect who follow a syncretic form of the Twelver branch of Shia Islam.

The Alawite homeland is in the Nusayri mountains coastal region, inland of the Mediterranean ports of Latakia and Tartus. Historically, the Alawites lived in about eighty villages in the region. The Kalbiyya are one of the four tribes, or tribal confederations, into which the Alawite community is divided, the others being the Matawira, Haddadin, and Khayyatin.

== Demographics and social organisation ==
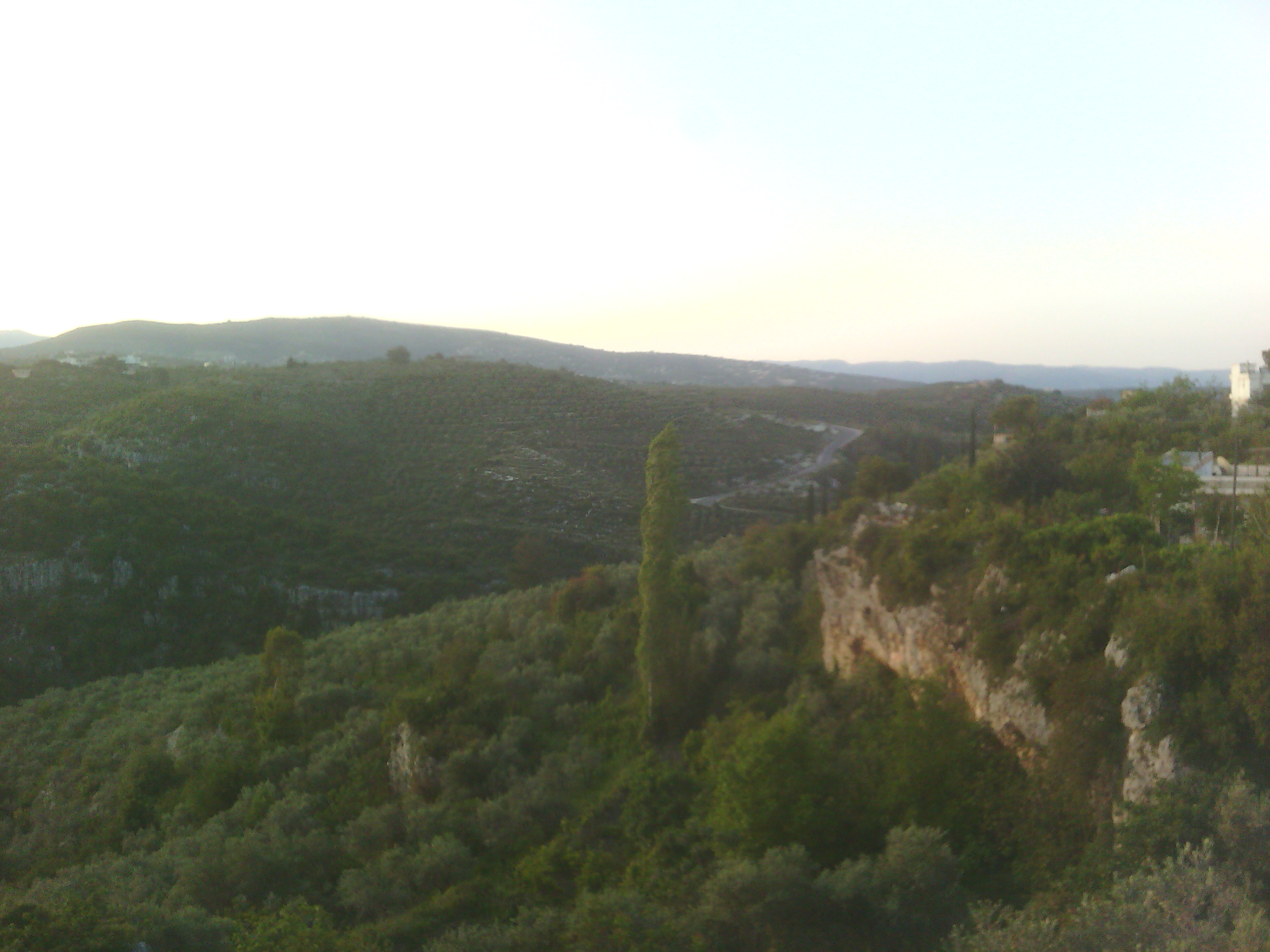
The Nusayri mountains, homeland of the Kalbiyya, near Qardaha

The Kalbiyya were estimated in 2011 to number approximately 480,000 out of a population of 3 million Alawites in Syria. At that time the total Syrian population was around 22 million. The main areas of Kalbiyya settlement are the districts of Jableh, Haffa and Latakia and the town of Qardaha, all within Latakia Governorate in north west Syria. They are the most geographically compact of the Alawite tribes, the others being more dispersed in non-contiguous areas across the coastal region.

The Kalbiyya consists of five branches: Rashawneh, Junaydi, al-Nawasireh, al-Jurud, and al-Qarahilah. Each branch of an Alawite tribe has its own hereditary chief, a structure which leads to frequent internal disputes within Alawite society. The Junayd family typically provide the leadership of the Kalbiyya and was based at Tell Salhab, near Masyaf. Traditionally, Alawite society is divided into three classes: religious leaders, landowners and peasants, with religious leadership, like chieftaincy, being hereditary.

== History ==
=== Emergence and Ottoman period ===
There are no known references to the Kalbiyya in medieval sources. They are not, for instance, mentioned among the tribes led by the 13th century Alawite paramount leader Makzun al-Sinjari. It is only after the Ottoman conquest of Syria in the early 16th century that the Kalbiyya are mentioned in historical records. Stefan Winter, an historian specialising in Ottoman Syria, notes that, despite this, they may have existed as a grouping before the 16th century (but without any "special role" among the Alawites). He also speculates that their name "may originally have invoked a link" with the medieval Banu Kalb bedouin tribal confederation.

There is evidence that, following the conquest, the Kalbiyya were among the tribes favoured by the Ottomans in order to use them as part of their local administrative control and tax collection structure. The Kalbiyya's emergence as a recognised group may therefore be linked to this Ottoman policy. Nevertheless, there were a number of Kalbiyya rebellions during the 16th century, and by the beginning of the 19th century, the Kalbiyya had a reputation for lawlessness and were in constant and open conflict with the Ottoman authorities.

In the 1850s, Samuel Lyde, an English missionary, lived among the Kalbiyya and built a mission and school in the Kalbiyya village of Bhamra. He subsequently published a negative but influential account of his time there, in which he wrote that he was convinced that they were like St Paul's description of the heathen: "filled with all unrighteousness, fornication, wickedness, covetousness, maliciousness". He criticized their brigandage, feuds, lying and divorce and claimed that "the state of [their] society was a perfect hell upon earth". Lyde's account has been described as "colourful" but "unreliable" in certain respects.

The Assad family

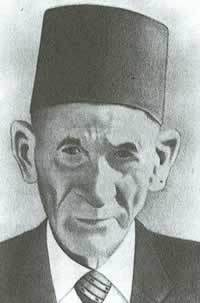
Ali Sulayman

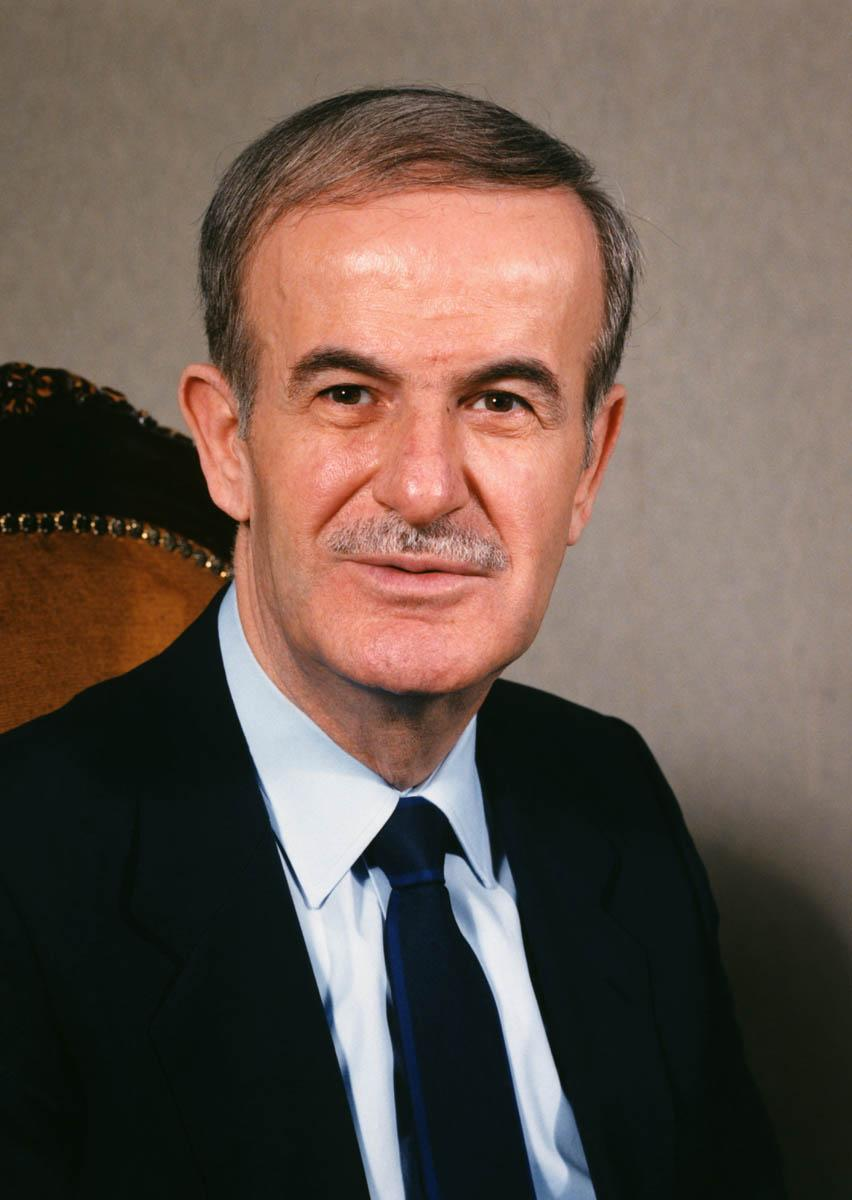
Hafez al-Assad

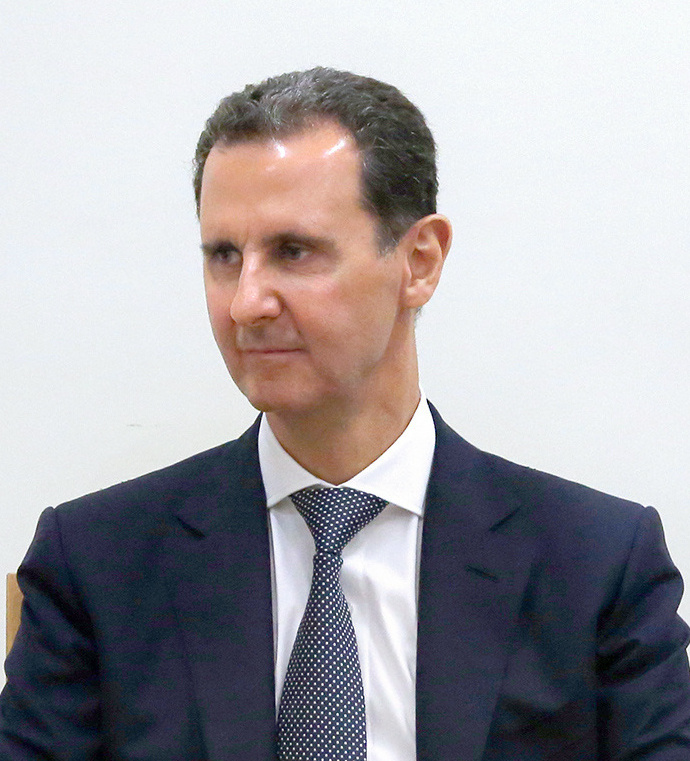
Bashar al-Assad

During the mid-19th century, there were rising tensions in the mountains due to the pressure on resources from a growing population and attempts by the central government to enforce direct rule. In 1854, the governor of Latakia Sanjak was killed in a battle by the Kalbiyya of Qardaha. Buoyed by their victory, the Kalbiyya raided the gardens of Latakia and Jableh. Raids by the tribesmen and counterattacks by the Ottomans continued for some time. Alawites were prohibited from entering Latakia and Jableh without a certificate of safe conduct by the sanjak governor and trade between the largely Sunni Muslim townspeople and the Alawite mountaineers was conducted in a souk on the outskirts of Latakia for security purposes. By the end of the 19th century, relations had improved between the rural Alawites and urban Sunnis. This was partly due to Ottoman efforts to bring the Alawites into the Muslim fold and void pretexts for European interventionism (as had occurred with the Maronites of Mount Lebanon in 1861) and partly because of the burgeoning ties between Latakia's merchants and Alawite tribal chiefs to secure the mountaineers' supply of tobacco for export.

=== During the French mandate ===
Following the end of Ottoman rule after World War I, Syria became part of the French mandate, which was subdivided into separate territories including an Alawite State. By 1930, Syria as a whole had an Alawite population of 213,870, of which 50,700 were Kalbiyya.

The Alawite community was divided between "separatists" who supported the maintenance of a separate Alawite state and "nationalists" or "unionists", who advocated integration into a wider Syrian or even pan-Arab state. The Kalbiyya leadership was similarly divided and through the 1920s and 1930s individual chiefs shifted between separatism and the nationalist/unionist position depending on prevailing opinions within the tribe. Nevertheless, in the negotiations leading to the Alawite State joining the Mandatory Syrian Republic in 1936, even nationalist Kalbiyya chiefs signed letters asking for separation from Syria to be maintained for fear of Sunni domination. One of the Kalbiyya leaders whose signature appears on one of the letters was Ali Sulayman, father of Hafez al-Assad, later president of Syria. It should, however, be noted that historian Stefan Winter has questioned the authenticity of these letters.

=== Post-Syrian independence ===
Syria became independent in 1946 but suffered from political instability in its first years and, in 1963, the Ba'athist coup overthrew the then government. The coup was led by three Alawites: Salah Jadid, Muhammad Umran and Hafez al-Assad. Assad was from the Kalbiyya tribe, Umran from the Khayyatin, and Jadid from the Haddadin. Following Assad's seizure of sole power in 1970, part of his strategy was to concentrate control in the hands of members of his own Kalbiyya tribe. The Kalbiyya's rise under came at the detriment of the historically more dominant and prestigious Alawite confederations, the Haddadin and Khayyatin. In 1970, the Kalbiyya numbered 108,800 compared to a total Syrian population of 6,305,000.

Although Alawites in general dominated the government, as historian Jordi Tejel points out, in practice "active participation" in the Assad regime was limited to the Kalbiyya. There is evidence that the Kalbiyya areas received much greater infrastructure investment and other economic benefits compared to other Alawite areas. According to anthropologist Fabrice Balanche, the Kalbiyya's dominance of power in Syria was not the primary objective of Hafez al-Assad but rather a result of his placement of relatives in key military and bureaucratic positions. While their kinship ties to the president gave them an advantage over the rest the population, Hafez al-Assad could not rely solely on the Kalbiyya and forged alliances and relations with other Syrian tribes and communities to broaden his base in the country.

Assad, following his death in 2000, was succeeded as president by his son, Bashar. The latter continued to rule through the same power structures as his father, with the Kalbiyya playing a central role. With the advent of the 2011 uprising and subsequent civil war, there was even greater focus on this policy. In 2012–2013, some 90% of regime army generals, according to sources close to the government, were not only Alawite but from the Kalbiyya tribe.

== Notable Kalbiyya ==
- Ali Sulayman al-Assad, tribal leader and father of Hafez al-Assad, d.1963.
- Hafez al-Assad, President of Syria 1971-2000.
- Bashar al-Assad, President of Syria 2000-2024.
- Ali Aslan, Chief of Staff of the Syrian Army 1998-2002.
- Shafiq Fayadh, Syrian General under Hafez al-Assad.
- Ghazi Kanaan, Head of Syrian Intelligence in Lebanon 1982-2002; Syrian Minister of the Interior 2004-2005.
- Mohammed Nasif Kheirbek, Deputy Vice President for Security Affairs 2005–2015; Deputy Director of the General Security Directorate 1999–2005
- Badawi al-Jabal, Syrian poet, d.1981.

== Bibliography ==
- Akhmedov, Vladimir M. (2022). "The Syrian Revolution". In Goldstone, Jack A.; Grinin, Leonid; Korotayev, Andrey (eds.). Handbook of Revolutions in the 21st Century: The New Waves of Revolutions, and the Causes and Effects of Disruptive Political Change. Springer. ISBN 978-3-030-86467-5.
- Alkan, Necati (2022). Non-Sunni Muslims in the Late Ottoman Empire: State and Missionary Perceptions of the Alawis. Bloomsbury. ISBN 978-0-7556-1684-8.
- Balanche, Fabrice (2000). "Les Alaouites, l'espace et le pouvoir dans la région côtière syrienne : une intégration nationale ambiguë" (in French). Tours: Université François Rabelais.
- Batatu, Hanna (1999). Syria's Peasantry, the Descendants of Its Lesser Rural Notables, and Their Politics. Princeton University Press. ISBN 978-0-691-00254-5.
- Commins, David (2004). Historical Dictionary of Syria. Scarecrow Press. ISBN 978-0-8108-4934-1.
- Cordesman, Anthony H. (2002). Peace and War: The Arab-Israeli Military Balance Enters the 21st Century. Greenwood Publishing Group. ISBN 978-0-275-96939-4.
- Droz-Vincent, Philippe (2016). "The Syrian Military and the 2011 Uprising". In Croissant, Aurel; Lawson, Fred H.; Albrecht, Holger (eds.). Armies and Insurgencies in the Arab Spring. University of Pennsylvania Press. ISBN 978-0-8122-4854-8.
- Field, Michael (1994). Inside the Arab World. Harvard University Press. ISBN 978-0-674-45521-4.
- Firro, Kais M. (1997). "The Attitude of the Druzes and 'Alawis vis-à-vis Islam and Nationalism in Syria and Lebanon". In Kellner-Heikele, Barbara; Kehl-Bodrogi, Krisztina; Otter-Beaujean, Anke (eds.). Syncretistic Religious Communities in the Near East. Brill. ISBN 978-90-04-10861-5.
- Goldsmith, Leon T. (2015). Cycle of Fear: Syria's Alawites in War and Peace. Hurst. ISBN 978-1-84904-468-4.
- Howse, Christopher (5 August 2011). "Secretive sect of the rulers of Syria". The Telegraph.
- Menzies, James W.; Granados Palmer, Gina (2019). "Alawites". In Shaw, Jeffrey M.; Demy, Timothy J. (eds.). Religion and Contemporary Politics: A Global Encyclopedia. Vol. 2. ABC-CLIO. ISBN 978-1-4408-3933-7.
- Moosa, Matti (1987). Extremist Shi'ites: The Ghulat Sects. Syracuse University Press. ISBN 978-0-8156-2411-0.
- Nisan, Mordechai (2015). Minorities in the Middle East: A History of Struggle and Self-Expression (2nd ed.). McFarland. ISBN 978-0-7864-5133-3.
- PCGN (2011). "Syria: Toponymic Factfile" (PDF). UK Permanent Committee on Geographical Names – via www.gov.uk/government/publications/toponymic-factfiles.
- Pipes, Daniel (1992). Greater Syria: The History of an Ambition. Oxford University Press. ISBN 978-0-19-506022-5.
- Rolland, John C. (2003). Lebanon: Current Issues and Background. Nova Publishers. ISBN 978-1-59033-871-1.
- Seale, Patrick (1990). Asad: The Struggle for the Middle East. University of California Press. ISBN 978-0-520-06976-3.
- Tejel, Jordi (2008). Syria's Kurds: History, Politics and Society. Routledge. ISBN 978-0-415-42440-0.
- Tibi, Bassam (1990). "The Simultaneity of the Unsimultaneous: Old Tribes and Imposed Nation-States in the Modern Middle East". In Khoury, Philip S.; Kostiner, Joseph (eds.). Tribes and State Formation in the Middle East. University of California Press. ISBN 978-0-520-07080-6.
- Williams, Victoria R. (2020). Indigenous Peoples: An Encyclopedia of Culture, History, and Threats to Survival. Vol. 1. Greenwood Press. ISBN 978-1-4408-6117-8.
- Winter, Stefan (2016). A History of the 'Alawis: From Medieval Aleppo to the Turkish Republic. Princeton University Press. ISBN 978-0-691-17389-4.
- Zisser, Eyal (1999). "The 'Alawis, Lords of Syria: From Ethnic Minority to Ruling Sect". In Bengio, Offra; Ben-Dor, Gabriel (eds.). Minorities and the State in the Arab World. Lynne Rienner Publishers. ISBN 978-1-55587-647-0.
- Zisser, Eyal (2006). "Bashar Al-Asad: Between East and West". In Litvak, Meir (ed.). Middle Eastern Societies and the West: Accommodation or Clash of Civilizations?. Syracuse University Press. ISBN 978-965-224-073-6.
