= Ali al-Assad =

Syrian farmer and tribal leader (1875–1963)

- عَلِيّ الْأَسَّد
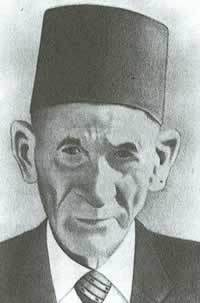
- An undated photo of Assad
- Born: Ali ibn Sulayman al-Wahhish; 1875; Qardaha, Latakia Sanjak, Ottoman Empire (now Syria)
- Died: 1963 (aged 87–88)
- Occupations: Farmer and tribal leader
- Spouses: Sa'ada Falfal; Na'isa Shalish
- Children: With Sa'ada Falfal: Hala; Ahmed; Ibrahim; Husayba; Isma'il; With Na'isa Shalish: Bahija; Muhammad; Bahjat; Hafez; Jamil; Rifaat
- Parent(s): Sulayman ibn Ahmed ibn Ibrahim ibn Sulayman al-Wahhish; Fariha Mehash
- Relatives: Al-Assad family

Ali ibn Sulayman al-Assad (Note: Arabic: عَلِيّ الْأَسَّد, romanized: ʿAlī al-ʾAsad) (né al-Wahhish; (Note: Arabic: الْوَحْش, romanized: al-Waḥsh) 1875 – 1963) was a Syrian farmer and tribal leader who was the father of Syrian Presidents Hafez al-Assad, in power from 1971 to 2000, and grandfather of Bashar al-Assad, in power from 2000 to 2024.

== Personal life ==
Ali ibn Sulayman al-Wahhish was the son of Sulayman ibn Ahmed ibn Ibrahim ibn Sulayman al-Wahhish. The al-Assad family lived in Qardaha, an Alawite town in the mountainous Latakia Sanjak of the Ottoman Empire. They were members of the Alawite Kalbiyya tribe.

Ali was known for protecting the weak and in the 1920s had assisted refugees fleeing the former province of Aleppo when France gave parts of it to Turkey. He was one of the few literate Alawites in his village and the only man in the village to subscribe to a newspaper. For his accomplishments, Ali was called al-Assad ("the Lion") by his fellow Alawites, and made the nickname his surname in 1927.

Ali married two times and over three decades had eleven children. His first wife, Sa'ada Falfal, was from the district of Haffeh. They had three sons and two daughters. His second wife Na'isa Shalish was twenty years his junior. She was the daughter of Uthman Abbud from the village of Qutilba, about 12 kilometres (7 miles) further up the mountain. They had one daughter and five sons. The fourth child, Hafez, was born on 6 October 1930.

== Political influence ==
Ali ibn Sulayman al-Assad (Note: The signator might be Ali al-Assad or his father Sulayman, as the letter was signed with the name of Sulayman Assad.) was one of the signatories of a supposed letter "No. 3547" addressed to French Prime Minister Léon Blum on 15 June 1936, which implored the French not to abandon Syria. However, historian Stefan Winter argues that this letter is a forgery. Historian Yaron Friedman located a copy of the original Alawi petition to Léon Blum, preserved under catalog number SDN 242QO Petition 598 in the French diplomatic archives. It is suggested that this petition was written by a single Alawi poet, Badawi al-Jabal, rather than being signed by notable Alawi leaders or ancestors of the al-Assad family. The disputed letter states:

On the occasion of the ongoing negotiations between France and Syria, it is an honor for us, we the Alawites leaders in Syria, to draw your attention and your party's attention to the following points:

1. The Alawite people who have kept their independency year after year, with jealousy and large sacrifices from their souls. They are people of different religious beliefs, traditions, and history than the Sunni Muslim people, never subjected to the rule of the interior cities.
2. The Alawite people refuse to be attached to the Muslim Syria, because Islam is considered the country's official religion. In the Islamic religion, the Alawite people are considered infidels. So we draw your attention to what awaits the Alawites of a scary and horrible fate, if they are forced to be a part of Syria when the Mandate ends, and when laws derived from religion will be in a position to be applied.
3. Granting Syria's independence and abolishing the Mandate would be a strong example of socialist principles in Syria, but that absolute independency means control of some Muslim families over the Alawite people in Cilicia, Iskenderun [in 1939 Iskenderun detached from Syria and became a part of Turkey] and the mountains of Nusayrih. The presence of a parliament and a constitutional government do not create individual freedom. Parliamentary rule is fake; it has no value. Under its skin, in fact, there hides a system dominated by intolerance of religious minorities. Do the French leaders want to empower Muslims against the Alawite people to throw them [the Alawites] into the arms of misery?
4. The spirit of hatred and fanaticism embedded in the hearts of the Arab Muslims against everything that is non-Muslim has been perpetually nurtured by the Islamic religion. There is no hope that the situation will ever change. Therefore, the abolition of the mandate will expose the minorities in Syria to the dangers of death and annihilation, irrespective of the fact that such abolition will annihilate the freedom of thought and belief. Here we see today how the Muslim citizens of Damascus forced the Jews living among them to sign a document pledging not to send food to their fellow, ill-fated Jews in Palestine. The Jewish situation in Palestine is clear, tangible evidence of the importance of the religious issue to Arab Muslims toward all who do not belong to Islam. Those good Jews who came to Arab Muslims with peace and civilization, and spread on the land of Palestine gold and positive well-being, have [left] no sign of harm on anyone and did not take anything by force. However, Muslims have declared a "Holy War" against them, and did not hesitate to slaughter their children and wives, despite the French and English presence in Palestine and Syria. Therefore, a black fate awaits Jews and other minorities if the Mandate is cancelled, and the unification of Syrian Muslims with Palestinian ones. This unification is the supreme goal of Arabic Muslims.
5. We appreciate the noble feeling you carry in your defense of the Syrian people, as well as the desire to achieve independence. But, at this time, Syria is still far from the noble goal for which it aims, as it is still subject to a feudal, religious spirit. We do not think that the French government and the French Socialist Party would accept granting Syrian independence, which in application would mean enslaving the Alawite people and exposing minorities to the risk of death and annihilation. The Syrian request to include the Alawite people in Syria is impossible for you to accept, or agree upon, because of your noble principles, if they supported freedom of thought. [Your noble principles] would not agree with stifling the freedom of other people in order to force them to join.
6. You might see that it is possible to secure the rights of the Alawite minority with provisions of a treaty, but we assure you that treaties have no value in the Islamic mentality in Syria. As such, we saw this previously in the treaty between England and Iraq, which prevented Iraqis from massacring the Assyrians and the Yazidis. So, the Alawite people, whom we represent, are gathered as signatories to this memorandum. They are crying out and asking the French government and the French Socialist Party to ensure their rights and independence within their small sphere, and putting this between the hands of the French and Socialist leaders. [The Alawites] are loyal friends who have given great services to the French, threatened by death and annihilation.

— Aziz Agha al-Hawash, Mahmud Agha Jadid, Mohammad Bek Junaid, Sulayman Assad, Suleiman Murshid and Mohammad Suleiman Al-Ahmad,

The letter praises the Jews in Palestine and includes them among the groups that are persecuted by the Muslims. It is possible that this aspect of the letter was not sincere but was intended to curry favor with Léon Blum, the French Prime Minister to whom it was addressed, who was a Jew.

On 31 August 2012, the permanent representative of France to the United Nations Gérard Araud mentioned the letter in response to the Syrian diplomat Bashar Jaafari.

== See also ==
- Al-Assad family

== Bibliography ==
- Darke, Diana (2018). The Merchant of Syria: A History of Survival. Oxford University Press.
- Stefan Winter: The Asad Petition of 1936: Bashar’s Grandfather Was Pro-Unionist, in: Syria Comment, 14 June 2016.
- Seale, Patrick (1990). Asad: The Struggle for the Middle East. University of California Press. ISBN 9780520069763.
- Alianak, Sonia (2007). Middle Eastern Leaders and Islam: A Precarious Equilibrium. Peter Lang. ISBN 9780820469249.
- Zahler, Kathy A. (2009). The Assads' Syria. Twenty-First Century Books. ISBN 9780822590958.
