= Business sector =

Part of the economy made up by companies

In economics, the business sector or corporate sector - sometimes popularly called simply "business" - is "the part of the economy made up by companies". It is a subset of the domestic economy, excluding the economic activities of general government, private households, and non-profit organizations serving individuals. The business sector is part of the private sector, but it differs in that the private sector includes all non-government activity, including non-profit organizations, while the business sector only includes business.

According to the national accounts terminology used by the OECD, the business sector is also known as the market sector. This designation refers to the existence of a market with recorded sales, transactions, and prices that permit the direct measurement of output. In this framework, the market sector coincides with the business sector.

In the United States, the business sector accounted for about 78 percent of the value of gross domestic product (GDP) as of 2000. Kuwait and Tuvalu each had business sectors accounting for less than 40% of GDP as of 2015.

In systems of state capitalism, much of the business sector forms part of the public sector. In mixed economies, state-owned enterprises may straddle any divide between public and business sectors, allowing analysts to use the concept of a "state-owned enterprise sector".

The Oxford English Dictionary records the phrase "business sector" in the general sense from 1934. Word usage suggests that the concept of a "business sector" came into wider use after 1940. Related terms in previous times included "merchant class" and "merchant caste".

== See also ==
- Business
- Private sector
- State-owned enterprise
