= Latakia Sanjak =

Prefecture of Ottoman Syria

Coordinates: 35°31′0″N 35°47′0″E

Latakia Sanjak سنجق اللاذقية
- sanjak of the Ottoman Empire; Under Tripoli Eyalet (1579–1864); Under Syria Vilayet (1864–1918)
- 1579–1918
- Coat of arms
- Capital: Latakia
- History
  - Established: 1579
  - Armistice of Mudros: 1918
Succeeded by
Occupied Enemy Territory Administration
- Today part of: Syria

The Latakia Sanjak (Arabic: سنجق اللاذقية) was a prefecture (sanjak) of the Ottoman Empire, located in modern-day Syria. The city of Latakia was the Sanjak's capital. It had a population of 144,447 in 1914. The sanjak included four districts (kaza): Latakia (Lazikiyye), Jableh (Cebele), Sahyun (Sahyûn) and Margat (Markab).
