= Al-Shir =

Al-Shir الشير
- Village
- Location within Syria
- Coordinates: 35°31′36″N 35°51′21″E
- Country: Syria
- Governorate: Latakia Governorate
- District: Latakia District
- Nahiyah: Hanadi

Population (2004 census)
  - Total: 2,129
- Time zone: UTC+2 (EET)
  - Summer (DST): UTC+3 (EEST)

Al-Shir (Arabic: الشير) is a town in western Syria, administratively part of the Latakia Governorate, located south of Latakia. Nearby localities include Baksa and Sqoubin to the north, Fideo to the east and Hanadi, al-Bassah and Bustan al-Basha to the south. According to the Syria Central Bureau of Statistics, al-Shir had a population of 2,129 in the 2004 census. Its inhabitants are predominantly Alawites.

On 7 March 2025, 24 civilians were executed by Syrian security forces while clashes in the Syrian coastal region were ongoing.
