= Makhlouf =

Makhlouf is both a surname and a given name. Notable people with the name include:

== People with the surname ==
- Anas Makhlouf (born 1973), Syrian footballer
- Anisa Makhlouf (1930–2016), First Lady of Syria
- Charbel Makhlouf (1828–1898), Lebanese Maronite monk and priest
- Georgia Makhlouf, Lebanese writer
- Hafez Makhlouf (born 1971), Syrian intelligence officer
- Hamdi Makhlouf (born 1980), Tunisian musician
- Hussein Makhlouf (born 1964), Syrian politician
- Ihab Makhlouf (1973–2024), Syrian businessman
- Issa Makhlouf, Lebanese writer and poet
- Iyad Makhlouf (born 1973), Syrian intelligence officer
- Mohammed Makhlouf (1932–2020), Syrian businessman
- Rami Makhlouf (born 1969), Syrian businessman
- Tal Makhlouf (born 1991), Israeli footballer

== People with the given name ==
- Makhlouf Eldaoudi (1825–1909), Ottoman rabbi
- Aryeh Makhlouf Deri (b. 1959), Israeli politician

== See also ==
- Maklouf
- Makhloufi
