= Al-Safsaf =

Al-Safsaf الصفصاف
- Village
- Location within Syria
- Coordinates: 35°39′9″N 35°55′33″E
- Country: Syria
- Governorate: Latakia Governorate
- District: Latakia District
- Nahiyah: Ayn al-Bayda

Population (2004 census)
  - Total: 3,259
- Time zone: UTC+2 (EET)
  - Summer (DST): UTC+3 (EEST)

Al-Safsaf (Arabic: الصفصاف) is a town in northwestern Syria, administratively part of the Latakia Governorate, located north of Latakia on the shores of Mashqita Lake. Nearby localities include Ayn al-Bayda, Al-Shamiyah and Burj Islam to the west, al-Bahluliyah to the east and Mushayrafet al-Samouk to the southwest. According to the Syria Central Bureau of Statistics, al-Safsaf had a population of 3,259 in the 2004 census. Its inhabitants are predominantly Alawites.
