= Salib al-Turkman =

Salib al-Turkman صليب التركمان Sılayip Türkmen ( صليب تركمان )
- Village
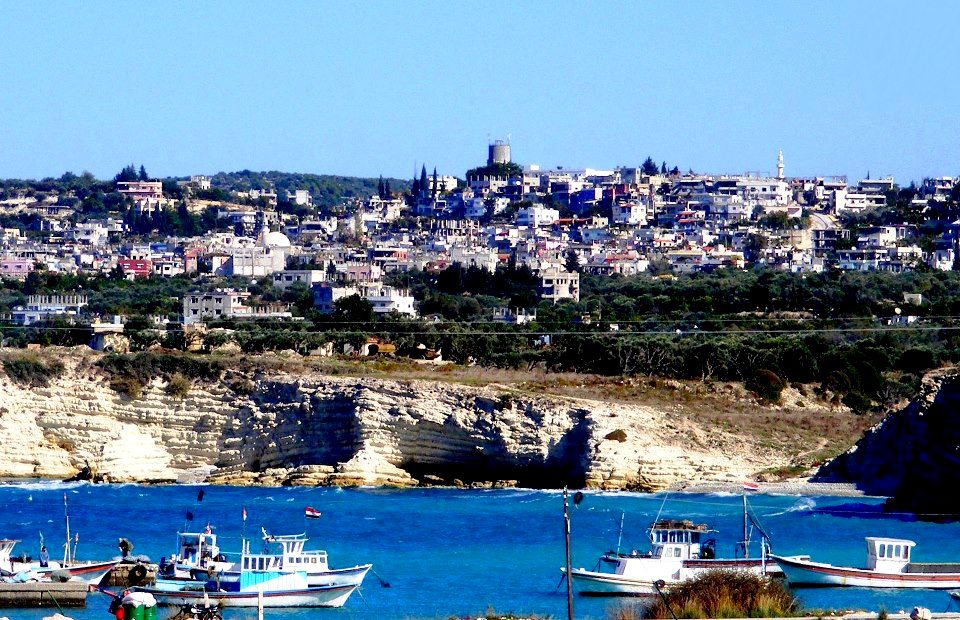
- View of Salib al-Turkman from the sea, 2013

- Location within Syria
- Coordinates: 35°41′16″N 35°48′51″E
- Country: Syria
- Governorate: Latakia Governorate
- District: Latakia District
- Nahiyah: Ayn al-Bayda

Population (2004 census)
  - Total: 3,466
- Time zone: UTC+2 (EET)
  - Summer (DST): UTC+3 (EEST)

Salib al-Turkman (Turkish: Sılayip Türkmen, Turkmen: صِلَيِّبْ تركمان, romanized: Silayīp Tūrkmān or Arabic: صُلَيْبْ التركمان, romanized: Sulayb al-Turkmān) is a town in northwestern Syria, administratively part of the Latakia Governorate, located north of Latakia. Nearby localities include Al-Shamiyah and Burj Islam to the south, Ayn al-Bayda, al-Bahluliyah and al-Shabatliyah to the east. According to the Syria Central Bureau of Statistics, Salib al-Turkman had a population of 3,466 in the 2004 census. Its inhabitants are predominantly Turkish-speaking Syrian Turkmen who are Sunni Muslim.
