= Al-Shabatliyah =

Al-Shabatliyah الشبطلية
- Village
- Location within Syria
- Coordinates: 35°41′9″N 35°49′39″E
- Country: Syria
- Governorate: Latakia Governorate
- District: Latakia District
- Nahiyah: Ayn al-Bayda

Population (2004 census)
  - Total: 3,306
- Time zone: UTC+2 (EET)
  - Summer (DST): UTC+3 (EEST)

Al-Shabatliyah (Arabic: الشبطلية) is a town in northwestern Syria, administratively part of the Latakia Governorate, located north of Latakia. Nearby localities include Al-Shamiyah and Burj Islam to the south, Ayn al-Bayda, al-Bahluliyah and Mashqita to the east. According to the Syria Central Bureau of Statistics, al-Shabatliyah had a population of 3,306 in the 2004 census. Its inhabitants are predominantly Alawites.
