= Umm al-Tuyour, Latakia Governorate =

Umm al-Tuyour أم الطيور
- Village
- Location within Syria
- Coordinates: 35.754836°N 35.846623°E
- Country: Syria
- Governorate: Latakia Governorate
- District: Latakia District
- Nahiyah: Qastal Ma'af

Population (2004 census)
  - Total: 1,101
- Time zone: UTC+2 (EET)
  - Summer (DST): UTC+3 (EEST)

Umm al-Tuyour (Arabic: أم الطيور, romanized: Umm al-Tūyūr) is a town in northwestern Syria, administratively part of the Latakia Governorate, located north of Latakia on the Mediterranean coast. Nearby localities include Al-Shamiyah and Burj Islam to the south, Ras al-Basit and al-Badrusiyah to the north. According to the Syria Central Bureau of Statistics, Umm al-Tuyour had a population of 1,101 in the 2004 census. Its inhabitants are predominantly of Turkmen origin.
