= Rabia, Syria =

Town in northwestern Syria

Al-Rabiea الربيعة
- Town
- Location within Syria
- Coordinates: 35°47′9″N 36°2′17″E
- Country: Syria
- Governorate: Latakia
- District: Latakia
- Subdistrict: Rabia

Population (2004 census)
  - Total: 1,986
- Time zone: UTC+2 (EET)
  - Summer (DST): UTC+3 (EEST)

Al-Rabiea (Arabic: الربيعة, romanized: Al-Rābeīā), also spelled Rabia (Arabic: ربيعة, romanized: Rābīāh) is a town in northwestern Syria, administratively part of the Latakia Governorate, located north of Latakia. Nearby localities include Kesab to the north, Mashqita and Ayn al-Bayda to the southwest and Qastal Ma'af to the west. It is located in the Bayirbucak region. According to the Syria Central Bureau of Statistics, Rabia had a population of 1,986 in the 2004 census. It is the administrative center of the Rabia nahiyah ("subdistrict"), which consisted of 21 localities with a collective population of 8,214 in 2004. The inhabitants of the town and the subdistrict are predominantly Sunni Muslim of Turkmen origin.

During the Syrian civil war, it was controlled by the Syrian Turkmen Brigades of the Free Syrian Army until 24 January 2016, when Syrian government forces supported by Russian air strikes took control of the town, cutting off a channel of supplies for the anti-Assad rebels from Turkey and returned the city to government control.
