= Qastal Ma'af =

Town in northwestern Syria

Qastal Ma'af قسطل معاف
- Town
- Location within Syria
- Coordinates: 35°49′29″N 35°57′6″E
- Country: Syria
- Governorate: Latakia
- District: Latakia
- Subdistrict: Qastal Ma'af

Population (2004 census)
  - Total: 585
- Time zone: UTC+2 (EET)
  - Summer (DST): UTC+3 (EEST)

Qastal Ma'af (Arabic: قسطل معاف) is a town in northwestern Syria, administratively part of the Latakia Governorate, located in the mountains north of Latakia. Nearby localities include Kesab to the north, Mashqita and Ayn al-Bayda to the south and Rabia to the east. According to the Syria Central Bureau of Statistics, Qastal Ma'af had a population of 585 in the 2004 census. It is the administrative center of the Qastal Ma'af nahiyah ("subdistrict"), which consisted of 19 localities with a collective population of 16,784 in 2004. The inhabitants of the town are predominantly Turkmen Sunni Muslim, and the inhabitants of the surrounding villages and subdistrict are predominantly Alawites.
