= Fideo, Syria =

Fideo فديو
- Village
- Location within Syria
- Coordinates: 35°31′11″N 35°53′24″E
- Country: Syria
- Governorate: Latakia Governorate
- District: Latakia District
- Nahiyah: Hanadi

Population (2004 census)
  - Total: 4,065
- Time zone: UTC+2 (EET)
  - Summer (DST): UTC+3 (EEST)
- Climate: Csa

Fideo (Arabic: فديو) is a village in northwestern Syria, administratively part of the Latakia Governorate, located east of Latakia. Nearby localities include Baksa and Sqoubin to the north, Hanadi and al-Bassah to the west, Bustan al-Basha to the south. According to the Syria Central Bureau of Statistics, Fideo had a population of 4,065 in the 2004 census. Its inhabitants are predominantly Alawites.
