= Al-Bassah, Syria =

Al-Bassah البصة
- Village
- Location within Syria
- Coordinates: 35°29′58″N 35°50′53″E
- Country: Syria
- Governorate: Latakia Governorate
- District: Latakia District
- Nahiyah: Hanadi

Population (2004 census)
  - Total: 4,369
- Time zone: UTC+2 (EET)
  - Summer (DST): UTC+3 (EEST)
- Climate: Csa

Al-Bassah (Arabic: البصة) is a town in northwestern Syria, administratively part of the Latakia Governorate, located south of Latakia. Nearby localities include Baksa and Sqoubin to the north, Hanadi and Fideo to the east and Bustan al-Basha to the south. According to the Syria Central Bureau of Statistics, al-Bassah had a population of 4,369 in the 2004 census. Its inhabitants are predominantly Alawites.
