= Mushayrafet al-Samouk =

Mushayrafet al-Samouk مشيرفة الساموك
- Village
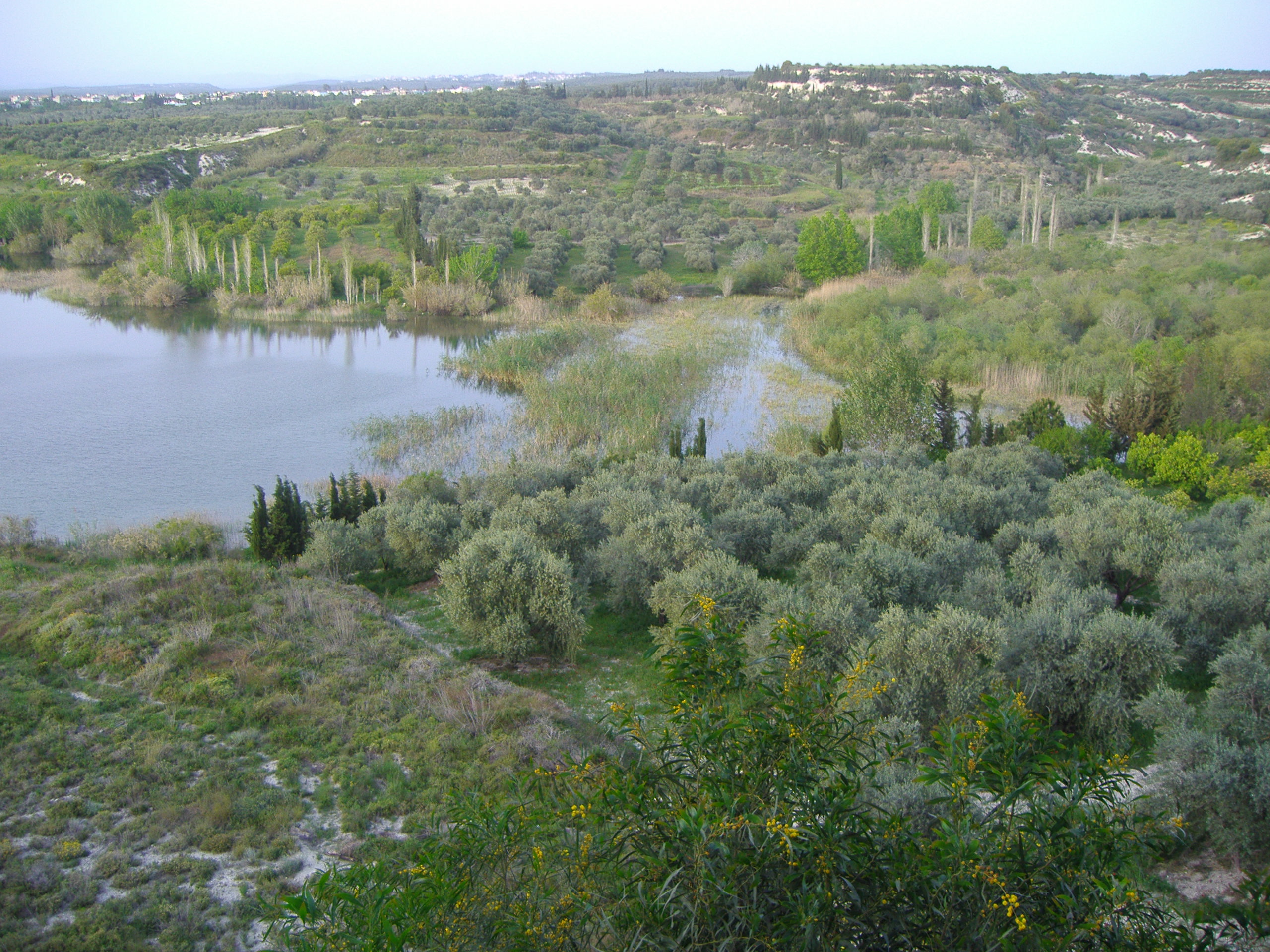

- Location within Syria
- Coordinates: 35°36′12″N 35°51′30″E
- Country: Syria
- Governorate: Latakia Governorate
- District: Latakia District
- Nahiyah: Latakia

Population (2004 census)
  - Total: 4,000
- Time zone: UTC+2 (EET)
  - Summer (DST): UTC+3 (EEST)

Mushayrafet al-Samouk (Arabic: مشيرفة الساموك) is a town in northwestern Syria, administratively part of the Latakia Governorate, located north of Latakia. Nearby localities include Kirsana and Burj al-Qasab to the west, al-Shamiyah to the northwest, al-Qanjarah and Baksa to the southwest. According to the Syria Central Bureau of Statistics, Sitmarkho had a population of 4,000 in the 2004 census. Its inhabitants are predominantly Alawites.
