= Garbis =

Garbis is a given name and a surname. People so named include:

== As a given name ==
- Garbis Aprikian (1926–2024), Armenian composer
- Garbis Kortian (1938–2009), French philosopher
- Garbis Zakaryan (1930–2020), Turkish boxer
- Garbis İstanbulluoğlu (1927–1994), Turkish football player and coach

== As a surname ==
- Marvin J. Garbis (born 1936), American judge
- Alexander Garbis (1921–1999), Indian cricketer
- Victor of Garbis

== See also ==
- Garbi (disambiguation)
- Edgar Garbisch
