= Umm al-Tuyour =

Umm al-Tuyour may refer to the following places in Syria:

- Umm al-Tuyour, Latakia Governorate
- Umm al-Tuyour, Hama Governorate
