= Hanadi =

Town in northwestern Syria

Hanadi هنادي
- Town
- Location within Syria
- Coordinates: 35°30′46″N 35°52′26″E
- Country: Syria
- Governorate: Latakia
- District: Latakia
- Subdistrict: Hanadi

Population (2004 census)
  - Total: 3,076
- Time zone: UTC+2 (EET)
  - Summer (DST): UTC+3 (EEST)

Hanadi (Arabic: هنادي) is a town in northwestern Syria, administratively part of the Latakia Governorate, located south of Latakia. Nearby localities include Baksa and Sqoubin to the north, al-Bassah to the west and Fideo to the east. According to the Syria Central Bureau of Statistics, Hanadi had a population of 3,076 as of the 2004 census. Its inhabitants are predominantly Alawites.
