= Elite forces (Syria) =

Anti-government armed militia in Syria

- قوات النخبة
- Leaders: Rami Makhlouf (founder); Suhayl al-Hasan (co-founder)
- Dates active: 27 April 2025 – present
- Size: Alleged by Makhlouf: 150,000 active fighters; 150,000 reservists; Up to 1,000,000 affiliated civilian members organized as popular committees

Elite forces (Arabic: قوات النخبة, romanized: Quwwāt an-Nukhba) is a Syrian militia announced in April 2025 by Rami Makhlouf, a prominent Syrian businessman and cousin of former President Bashar al-Assad. The group claims a force size of approximately 150,000 fighters, supported by an equivalent reserve force and around one million affiliated civilian members organized as popular committees. Its formation was officially declared through a lengthy statement posted on Makhlouf’s Facebook page.

== History ==
On 21 April 2025, Rami Makhlouf publicly announced the creation of the Elite forces via a Facebook post. He described the force as an elite military formation aimed at protecting the Syrian coastal region from security threats and instability. Makhlouf stated that the creation of the Elite forces was carried out in collaboration with Suhayl al-Hasan, a prominent military figure formerly affiliated with the Syrian Army's elite units under Assad.

The announcement came amid continued instability in the coastal region, following reported massacres and security lapses. According to Makhlouf, the initiative responded to what he characterized as the Syrian government's failure to protect the local population.

== Organization ==
The Elite forces reportedly consist of fifteen divisions, each composed of fighters described as "special forces". Additionally, an equally large reserve force is said to have been established. Makhlouf also claimed the mobilization of approximately one million civilians into popular committees supporting the main military body.

The exact organizational structure, command hierarchy, and logistical capabilities of the group remain unclear. No independent verification of the group's strength or deployments has been made available.

== Ideology and goals ==
According to the public statement attributed to Rami Makhlouf, the Elite forces aim to:

- Defend the Syrian coastal region against internal and external threats.
- Promote social and economic revitalization within the coastal areas.
- Establish a new political and security order in the region based on "justice, brotherhood, and tolerance".
- Cooperate with international actors, notably Russia, to guarantee protection and oversight of the region.

Makhlouf described the coastal region as deserving of special international protection and suggested placing its security and economic infrastructure under Russian supervision to ensure neutrality and stability.

== Controversies ==
The announcement of the Elite forces sparked significant controversy within Syria. Critics accused Makhlouf of attempting to create a semi-autonomous military and political entity separate from the central government. Allegations also surfaced linking Makhlouf and other ex-regime figures residing in Lebanon to the financing of previous unrest in the coastal areas.

The emergence of the Elite forces was perceived by some observers as part of broader attempts to establish a new Alawite-centric political body. While others saw it as Makhlouf's way to regain political and popular status while using the massacres of Alawites merely as a means to that.

Furthermore, Makhlouf's public denouncement of Bashar al-Assad as a "false lion" (Note: "Assad" in Arabic literally means lion.) and accusations of rampant corruption among his leadership underscored the profound schism between him and the then-ruling authorities.

== Reactions ==
=== Domestic ===
In response to Makhlouf’s statement, community leaders and residents of Makhlouf's hometown, Bustan al-Basha, issued a statement denouncing his messages and asserting that they do not represent the village or its people. The statement, published by a local notable, emphasized that such declarations from individuals abroad reflect only personal ambitions and risk harming the unity of Syria and the well-being of coastal communities.

=== International ===
Makhlouf openly appealed to the international community, particularly to the Russian Federation, seeking recognition and protection for the coastal region. He proposed placing the Elite forces’ resources under Russian oversight to ensure that their role remained defensive rather than retaliatory.

There has been no official response from Russia or other major international actors regarding the legitimacy or recognition of the Elite forces.

== See also ==
- Alawites in Syria
- Alawite State
- Russian intervention in the Syrian civil war
- Western Syria clashes
  - March 2025 Western Syria clashes
  - 2025 massacres of Syrian Alawites
