= Makhloufi =

Makhloufi (Arabic: مخلوفي) is an Arabic surname, commonly used in Algeria. Notable people with the surname include:

- Abdelkader Ould Makhloufi (1944–2025), Algerian boxer
- Amar Makhloufi (born 1943), Algerian engineer and politician
- Mehdi Makhloufi (born 1978), French-Algerian footballer
- Rabia Makhloufi (born 1986), Algerian steeplechase runner
- Taoufik Makhloufi (born 1988), Algerian middle-distance runner

== See also ==
- Makhlouf
