= Mashqita =

Mashqita مشقيتا
- Village
- Location within Syria
- Coordinates: 35°39′47″N 35°54′37″E
- Country: Syria
- Governorate: Latakia Governorate
- District: Latakia District
- Nahiyah: Ayn al-Bayda

Population (2004 census)
  - Total: 2,376
- Time zone: UTC+2 (EET)
  - Summer (DST): UTC+3 (EEST)

Mashqita (Arabic: مشقيتا) is a town in northwestern Syria, administratively part of the Latakia Governorate, located north of Latakia. Nearby localities include Ayn al-Bayda, Al-Shamiyah and Burj Islam to the west, al-Bahluliyah to the east and Mushayrafet al-Samouk to the southwest. According to the Syria Central Bureau of Statistics, Mashqita had a population of 2,376 in the 2004 census. Its inhabitants are predominantly Alawites.

== Syrian Civil War ==
At the start of the 2014 Latakia offensive, the residents fled towards the city of Latakia for safety.

== Notables ==
- Hani al-Rahib, (30 November 1939 – died 6 February 2000) novelist and literary academic.
