= Abdul-Hamid Dashti =

Former Kuwaiti parliamentarian

- عبد الحميد دشتي

Former Member of the Kuwait National Assembly

Personal details
- Born: August 5, 1954 (age 72)
- Education: Alexandria University

Abdul-Hamid Abbas Hussein Dashti (Arabic: عبد الحميد عباس حسين دشتي, born August 5, 1954), also known as Abdulhameed Dashti, is a lawyer and former member of the Kuwait National Assembly. He is a Kuwaiti of Iranian descent (Ajam of Kuwait). He graduated from the Kuwaiti Military College in 1974, where he started his career as a pilot and held several positions in the Kuwait Air Force until he resigned from military service in 1982. In 2015, his legal immunity was revoked by the Kuwaiti National Assembly and he was subsequently tried and convicted for insulting the Kuwaiti judiciary and insulting Saudi Arabia and Bahrain, for which he was sentenced in absentia to 14 years. On December 20, 2017, a new ruling was issued to imprison him for an additional 5 years, bringing the total prison sentences against him to 55 years, most of which were issued in absentia because he was not in Kuwait.

Abdul-Hamid Dashti is a large foreign investor in Syria where he is currently resident. In 2020 the Syrian government awarded Abdul-Hamid Dashti and his partner, sanctioned Syrian businessman Ihab Makhlouf a contract to operate Syria's duty-free shops.

== Education ==
- Graduated from the Military College in Kuwait in 1974
- He studied commerce at Beirut Arab University
- He holds a Bachelor of Laws from Alexandria University
