= Maklouf =

Maklouf is a surname and a derivative of Makhlouf. Notable people with the surname include:

- Mahmoud Maklouf or Mahmoud Makhlof Shafter (born 1975), Egyptian-Libyan footballer
- Raphael Maklouf (born 1937), British Jewish sculptor

== See also ==
- Makhlouf
