= Kessab =

Town in northwestern Syria

Kessab كسب Քեսապ
- Town
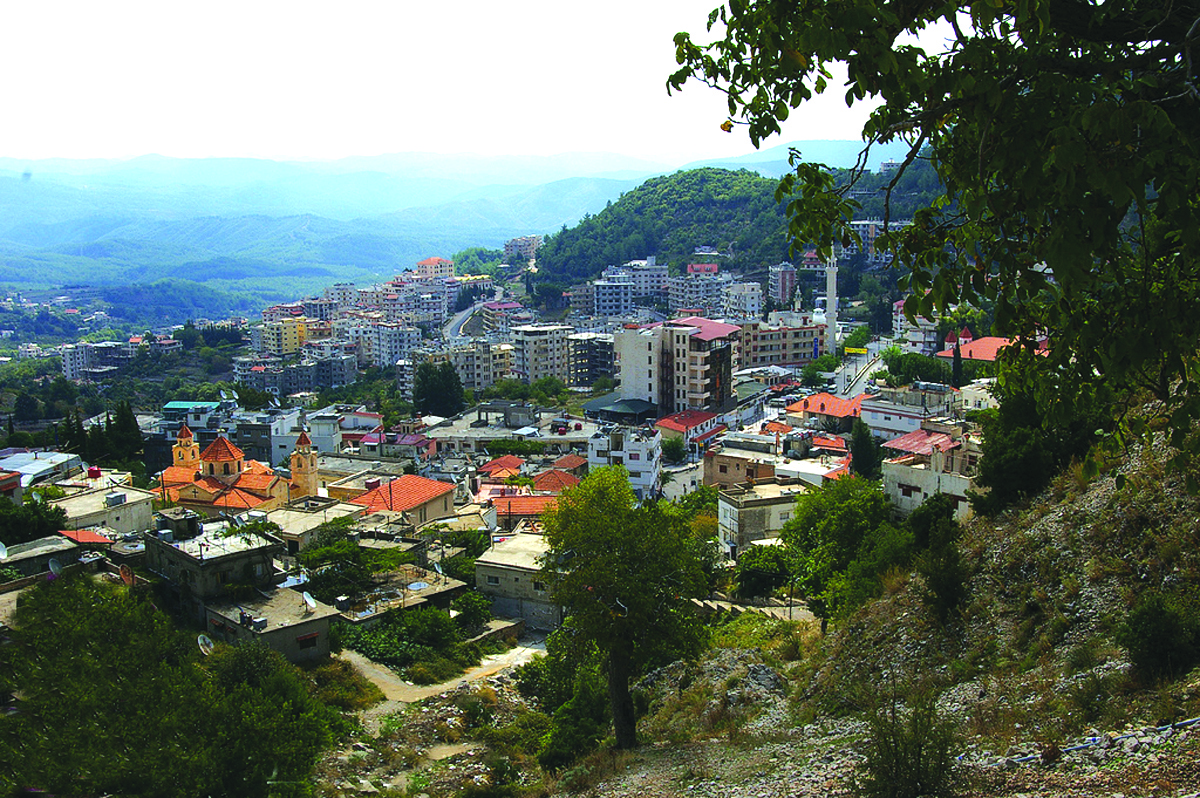
- The town of Kessab, Syria

- Location in Syria
- Coordinates: 35°55′30″N 35°59′19″E
- Country: Syria
- Governorate: Latakia
- District: Latakia
- Subdistrict: Kessab
- Elevation: 750 m (2,460 ft)

Population (2004)
  - Total: 1,754
- Time zone: UTC+2 (EET)
  - Summer (DST): UTC+3 (EEST)
- Climate: CSa

Kessab (Arabic: كسب [kæsæb]; Armenian: Քեսապ, romanized: Kesab), also spelled Kesab or Kasab, is a town in northwestern Syria, administratively part of the Latakia Governorate, located 59 kilometers north of Latakia. It is situated near the border with Turkey on the slope of Mount Aqraa, 800 meters above sea level. According to the Syria Central Bureau of Statistics, Kessab had a population of 1,754 in the 2004 census. Along with the surrounding villages, the sub-district of Kessab has a total population of around 2,500. Kessab has a majority Armenian population, which dates back to the medieval ages.

With its mild, moist climate and encirclement by wooded green mountains and deep valleys, Kessab is a favoured vacation resort for Syrians, mainly from Aleppo and Latakia.

== Geography ==
Administratively, Kessab belongs to the Latakia District; one of the governorate's four Manatiq, and the centre of Kessab nahiyah sub-district.

The town of Kessab is 59 kilometres north of Latakia, just 1 kilometre southwest of the border with Turkey (the former Syrian province of Alexandretta), and 7 kilometers east of the Mediterranean Sea.

Located at a height ranging between 650 and 850 above sea level, in the middle of dense coniferous Mediterranean forest, the town is a summer destination for Syrian people and for foreign visitors.

The town is surrounded with many mountains including the mountains of Bashord (857 meters), Dyunag (1008 meters), Dapasa (1006 meters), Chalma (995 meters) and Sildran (1105 metres) from the west, and mount al-Nisr (851 metres) from the south. Jebel Aqra -also known as Mount Casius- at the north, located in the Turkish side next to the borderline, is the highest peak of the Kessab region, with a height of 1709 meters.

Climate data for Kessab
Month	Jan	Feb	Mar	Apr	May	Jun	Jul	Aug	Sep	Oct	Nov	Dec	Year
Mean daily maximum °C (°F)	7.2 (45.0)	8.3 (46.9)	11.7 (53.1)	16.5 (61.7)	21.3 (70.3)	24.2 (75.6)	25.6 (78.1)	26.5 (79.7)	25.4 (77.7)	21.1 (70.0)	15.5 (59.9)	9.2 (48.6)	17.7 (63.9)
Mean daily minimum °C (°F)	1.4 (34.5)	1.3 (34.3)	3.6 (38.5)	6.7 (44.1)	11.0 (51.8)	14.5 (58.1)	17.1 (62.8)	17.4 (63.3)	14.9 (58.8)	11.3 (52.3)	6.8 (44.2)	2.2 (36.0)	9.0 (48.2)
Average precipitation mm (inches)	242 (9.5)	237 (9.3)	200 (7.9)	104 (4.1)	49 (1.9)	21 (0.8)	8 (0.3)	8 (0.3)	31 (1.2)	75 (3.0)	116 (4.6)	312 (12.3)	1,403 (55.2)
Average snowy days	5	3	1	0	0	0	0	0	0	0	0	3	12
Source: Weather Online, Weather Base, BBC Weather and My Weather 2, Climate data

== History ==
=== Early history ===
The region of Kessab was part of the ancient civilization that spread from the Syrian coasts up to the Orontes River, six millennia ago. During the Seleucid period the Kessab region was at the centre of the triad comprised by Antioch, Seleucia and Laodicea. The Laodicea-Seleucia coastal road passed by the Karadouran bay whereas the Laodicea-Antioch road passed through the Duzaghaj valley. The Mount Casius at those times, was believed to have been the sanctuary of Zeus. During the reign of the ruler of the short-lived Armenian Empire Tigranes The Great, in the 1st century BC, and later the Roman era, the Syrian coast flourished greatly and had a positive effect on the development of the Kessab region.

There are no written sources about the primitive history of the Kessab region, but the first record of the name of Kessab was mentioned in a historical document dating back to the Crusaders period when Duke Belmont I granted the region of "Kasbisi" to the family of Peter the Hermit. Either Kasbisi, Cassembella or most probably the Latin expression Casa Bella are the names from which "Kessab" was derived.

Being located on the borders of the Armenian Kingdom of Cilicia, the region of Kessab was gradually developed by its Armenian migrants. A research published in 2009 by renowned linguist Hagop Cholakian on the peculiarities of the Kessab Armenian dialect and the dialects of the Armenians in the region of Alexandretta and Suweidiyeh, shows that the Armenians of Kessab and the surrounding villages are the remainders of migrants who came from the region of Antioch. The migration of the Armenians to the region increased in the 14th and the 15th centuries, during the Mamluk and the Ottoman periods, in an attempt to avoid persecution at the hands of Muslim states, trying to find much safer mountainous regions such as Kessab and Musa Dagh. The first Armenian refugees settled in the area now called Esguran where they built their first church. After a period they moved uphill and settled in the area now called the town of Kessab, turning it to a centre of the whole region and the destination of new refugees.

During the 1850s Kessab turned into a mission field with the arrival of Evangelical and Catholic missionaries, raising anger among the Armenians of the region who were following the Armenian Apostolic Church. In the beginning of the 20th century, the population of Kessab region was around 6,000 (all Armenians), with more than 20 schools, as a result of denominational and political divisions.

=== 20th century ===
In Kessab in April 1909, in the Adana massacre, 10,000 Armenians were murdered. After the event, Catholicos Sahak I Khabaian visited Kessab.

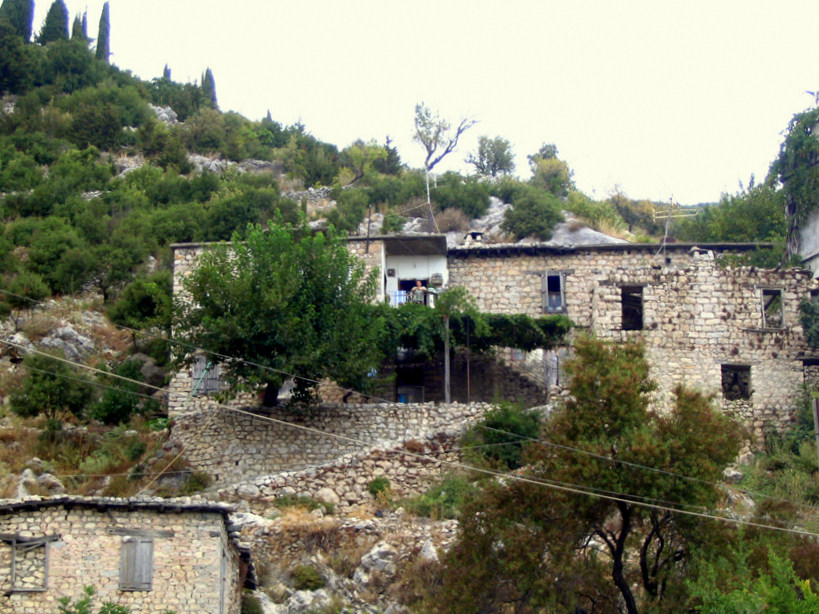
Traditional Armenian house in Kessab

The Armenian genocide beginning in 1915 proved even more destructive. The command of the genocide initiation arrived in Kessab on 26 July to start deportations within 5 days. First, the people expressed a desire to resist and fortify on the mountain Dounag located in Karadouran. Priest Betros Papoujian-Abrahamian, the priest of Karadouran, particularly supported the idea of the opposition, but on the real ground, the whole idea failed to become a reality. The genocide of the Armenians in Kessab region started from Karadouran. The Armenians were deported in two directions: one towards the vast Syrian Desert of Deir ez-Zor and the other towards the south to the desert of Jordan. Almost five thousand Armenians were killed during this deportation process. Some died in Jisr al-Shughur, some in Hama or Homs while others on the way to Damascus or Jordan. The majority of the refugees were killed in the desert of Deir ez-Zor. After the ceasefire, the Armenians who survived the genocide returned to Kessab in a process that lasted till 1920. But the eastern and northern areas of the region remained unsecured, because they were constantly vulnerable to attacks from neighboring Turkish villages. A voluntary group of 40 men successfully foiled many attempts by bandits to invade the region at that time. In 1922, peace was established after the entrance of French troops into Kessab.

On 5 July 1938, the Turkish Army entered the Sanjak of Alexandretta and Antioch, in an agreement with the French colonial authorities, and the region was renamed Hatay State. Many Armenians left Kessab for Lebanon or took refuge in the mountains. Many important personalities visited Kessab during that time. On 23 June 1939, the Hatay government was officially dissolved and the whole region became part of Turkey. By the efforts of the Armenian community of Paris, Cardinal Krikor Bedros Aghajanian and the Papal representative to Syria and Lebanon Remi Leprert, many parts of Kessab inhabited by Armenians were separated from Turkey and placed within the Syrian boundaries.

=== Syrian Civil War ===
==== Latakia offensive ====
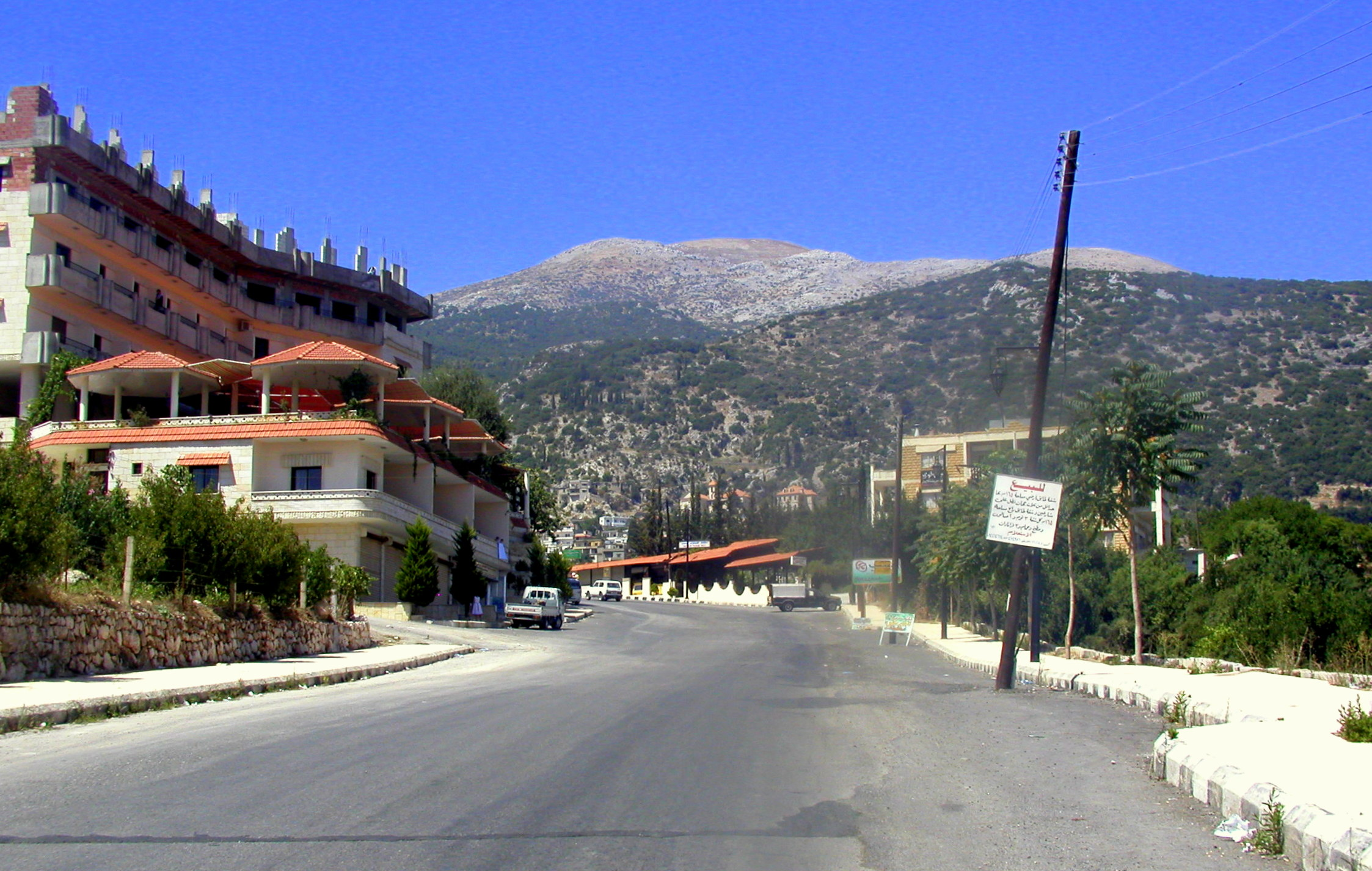
Jebel Aqra overlooking Kessab from Turkey

In the early hours of 21 March 2014, Kessab and its surrounding villages saw a multi-pronged attack by forces opposed to the Syrian government. It was reported that the attackers, members of the al-Nusra Front, Sham al-Islam, and Ansar al-Sham, advanced directly from Turkish territory, were being supported by the Turkish military, and that injured rebel fighters were being sent to medical centres in Turkey. Some Kessab village guards reported that the Turkish military withdrew from its positions along the border shortly before the fighters crossed from Turkey. Mehmet Ali Ediboğlu, MP of Turkish CHP party, who visited the area several days after the attack began, said that villagers on the Turkish side of the border told him that "thousands of fighters coming from Turkey crossed the border at at least five different points to launch the attack on Kassab". The fighters reportedly crossed into Syria from the village of Gözlekçiler, close to the border. Journalists were barred from visiting Gözlekçiler. Ediboğlu was also barred from approaching the border by Turkish soldiers but wrote of seeing "dozens of Syrian-plated cars nonstop transporting terrorists from the military road between Gözlekçiler village and our military base at Kayapinar." The civilian populations of Kessab and its surrounding villages either fled or were evacuated, with most seeking safety in Latakia, and Kessab came under the control of rebel groups. On 23 March, Turkish fighter jets shot down a Syrian fighter jet over Kessab that had been flying a support mission to assist Syrian army ground forces. The fighter crashed into Kessab. Turkey claimed that the jet had violated Turkish airspace, while Syria denied this. Turkish MP and CHP Party opposition leader Kemal Kılıçdaroğlu claimed that the Syrian jet was a reconnaissance plane and that its downing was part of a government scheme to provoke war with Syria to divert attention from corruption scandals enveloping Turkey's president Erdogan and his party. Journalist Amberin Zaman wrote that leaked tapes in which Turkish Foreign Minister, Ahmet Davutoğlu, is heard discussing ways to spark a war with Syria might vindicate Kilicdaroglu's claims.

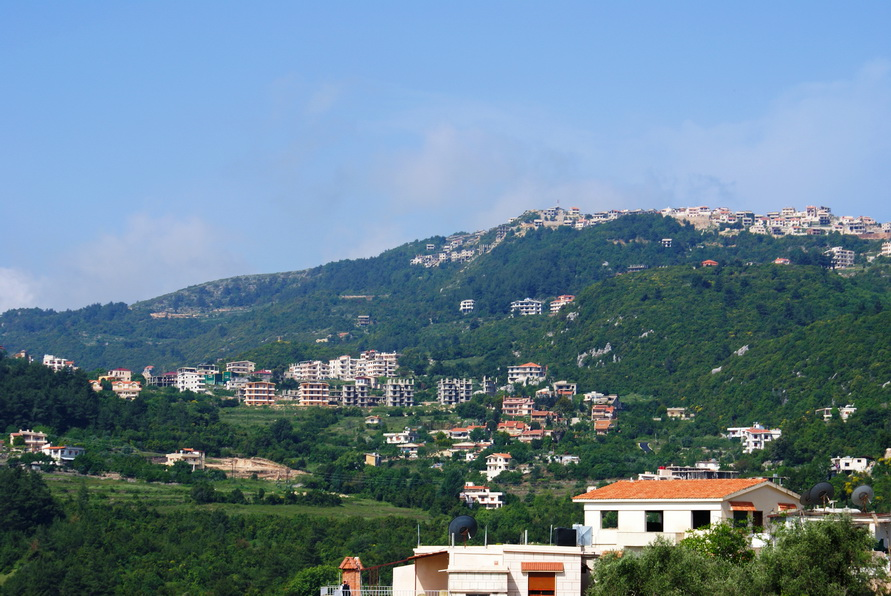
General view of the Kessab region in June 2013

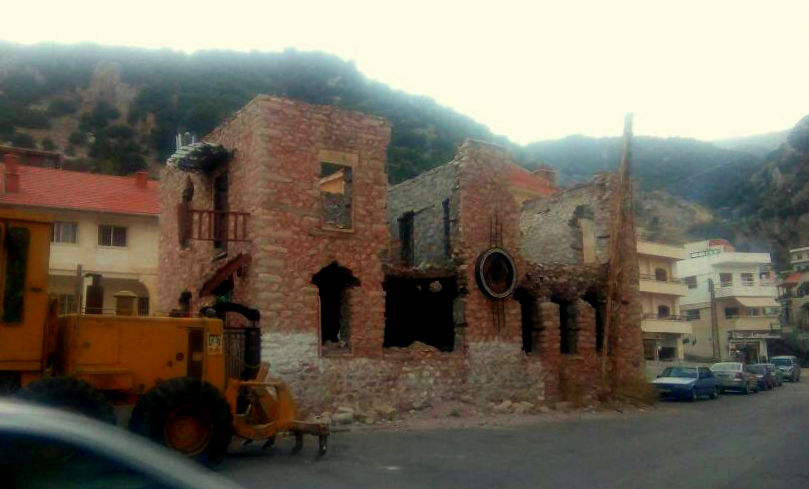
Misakian Cultural Centre of the Armenian Evangelical School in Kessab, burnt and destroyed by the Islamist rebels in March 2014 (photo taken in August 2017)

On 2 April, during a hearing before the House State-Foreign Operations Appropriations Subcommittee and in response to a question by congress member Adam Schiff, US ambassador to the UN Samantha Power, said that Kessab "is an issue of huge concern". Schiff said that many of the residents were descendants of victims of the Armenian Genocide and that "there is a particular poignancy to their being targeted in this manner." On 3 April Armenia's Minister of Diaspora Hranush Hakobyan said that 38 of Kessab's Armenian inhabitants had been captured when the town fell to the rebels, 24 of them were later released, 3 had been forcefully taken into Turkey and were now in the village of Vaqif, and that 670 Armenian families had been displaced after the attack on Kessab, with about 400 of the families now in Latakia. The minister also said that in Kessab Armenian churches had been defaced, crosses on the churches had been removed, and property looted. Also on 3 April, Ruben Melkonyan, deputy dean of the Oriental Studies department at Yerevan State University, said that the Armenian community of Kessab was unlikely to recover and that what had happened were "crimes that make a genocide".

On 15 June 2014, the Syrian Army entered Kessab and retook control over the surrounding villages and the border with Turkey. News agencies and local residents of Kessab reported that the town's Armenian Catholic and Evangelical churches had been ruined and burnt by the Islamist groups, along with the Misakyan Cultural Centre. Around 250 families from Kessab who had taken refuge in Latakia returned to their homes a day after the Syrian Army recaptured the town. On 25 July, the Holy Mother of God Church of Karadouran was reconsecrated, with the first liturgy since the ending of the Islamist occupation taking place on 27 July, the day of Vardavar, an Armenian holiday, and attended by a large number of people.

==== Post-Assad regime ====
After the fall of the Assad regime, the Kessab crossing between Syria and Turkey reopened on 11 December 2024, marking the first time since the onset of the civil war. On 17 January 2025, reports emerged that Syrian Turkmen militants raising Turkish flags entered the Turkmen and Alawite villages of Jabal Turkman, Rabia, Kessab, and other regions including Ras al-Bassit, Blouran Dam, Zeghreen and Wadi Qandil.

== Demographics ==
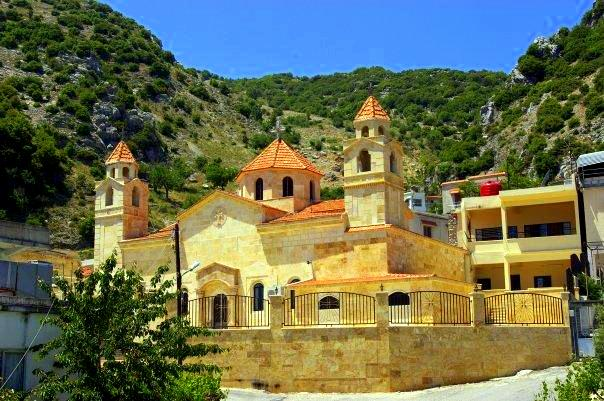
Holy Mother of God Armenian Apostolic Church

Holy Trinity Armenian Evangelical Church

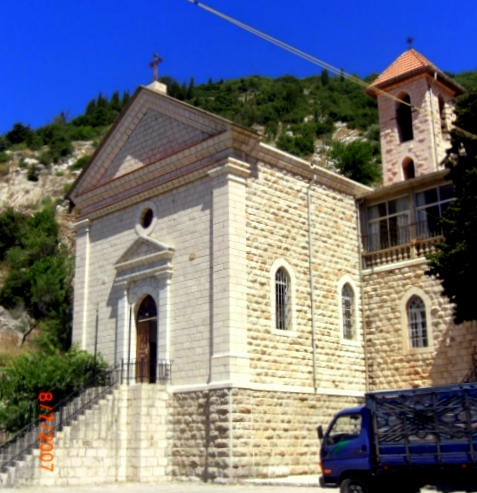
Saint Michael the Archangel Armenian Catholic Church

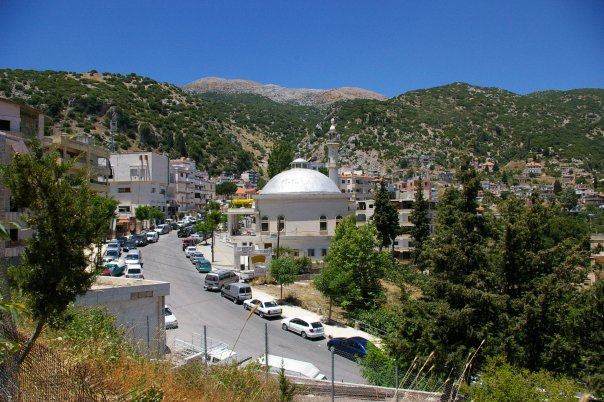
The Mosque of Kessab

The population is mainly Armenian. The Armenian community in Kessab dates back to the medieval ages. According to Ottoman records, the village had 26 households in 1535, several decades after the Ottoman conquest of Syria. In the late 19th century, German orientalist and traveler Martin Hartmann noted Kessab as a settlement of 200 houses populated by Armenians.

== Places of interest ==
The town of Kessab is home to three Armenian churches:

- The Holy Mother of God Armenian Apostolic Church
- Holy Trinity Armenian Evangelical Church, opened in 1970
- Saint Michael the Archangel Armenian Catholic Church, opened in 1925.

There are about 500 Alawite Muslims in Kessab, and a mosque was built in the early 1970s.

Churches in the nearby villages:

- Surp Stepanos (Saint Stephen) Armenian Apostolic Church of Karadouran, built in 909. It is the oldest standing Armenian church in Syria. It was renovated in 1987 by the Armenian-French organization "Yergir yev Mshaguyt" (Country and Culture).
- Holy Mother of God Armenian Apostolic Church of Karadouran: On 18 October 2009, Catholicos Aram I of the Holy See of Cilicia, consecrated the new Church of the Holy Mother of God in Karadouran. The newly built church replaced the old church originally built in 1890 and ruined in 1942, then rebuilt in 1950 and was about to crumble at the beginning of the 21st century.
- Armenian Evangelical Church of Keorkeuna, opened in 1899.
- Armenian Evangelical Church of Karadouran, opened in 1908 and renovated in 1986.
- Emmanuel Armenian Evangelical Church of Ekizolukh, opened as a small chapel in 1911 and reconstructed in 1956.
- Church and convent of Our Lady of Assumption of the Armenian Catholics in Baghjaghaz, opened in 1890 and renovated in 2003.
- Our Lady of Joy Greek Catholic Monastic complex of Karadash.
- Notre-Dame Greek Orthodox Church of Esguran: built between 1990 and 2002, to replace the old Greek chapel of the village, destroyed by the Turkish army in the early 1980s.

== Notable people ==
- Moses Housepian (1876–1952), physician and relief worker
- Antranig Chalabian (1922–2011), US-based Armenian historian, medical illustrator and cartographer.
- Karekin I Sarkissian (1932–1999), Catholicos of All Armenians 1994–1999, and catholicos of the Great House of Cilicia 1983–1994 as Karekin II
- Garbis Kortian (1938–2009), philosopher
- Mehmet Aksoy (b. 1939), Turkish sculptor
- Hagop Cholakian (b. 1947), Armenian writer, linguist, and teacher, head of the Western Armenian language section of the Armenian Institute of Language.

== Gallery ==
Kessab

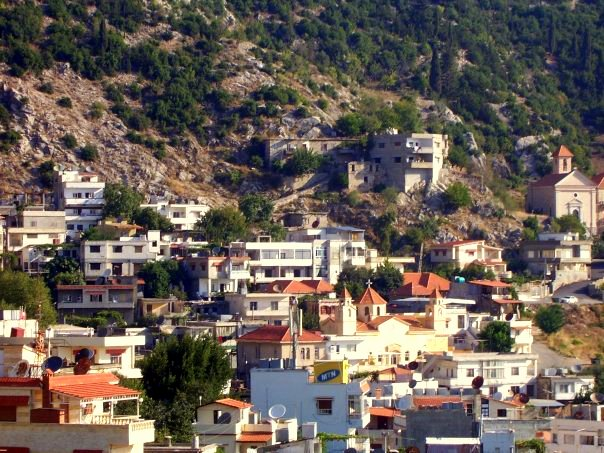
General view

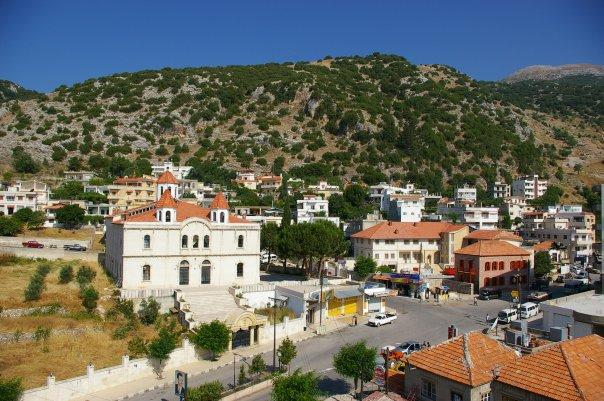
Downtown Kessab

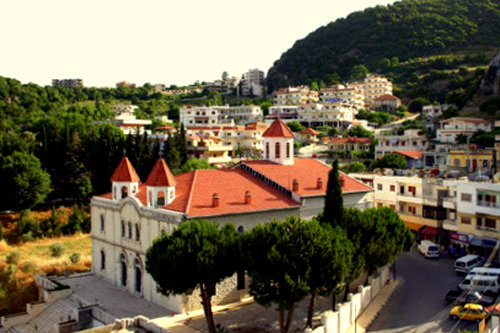
Gala residential neighbourhood

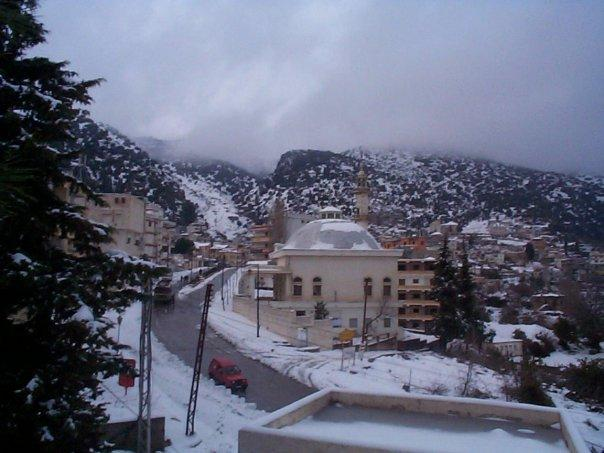
Kessab in winter

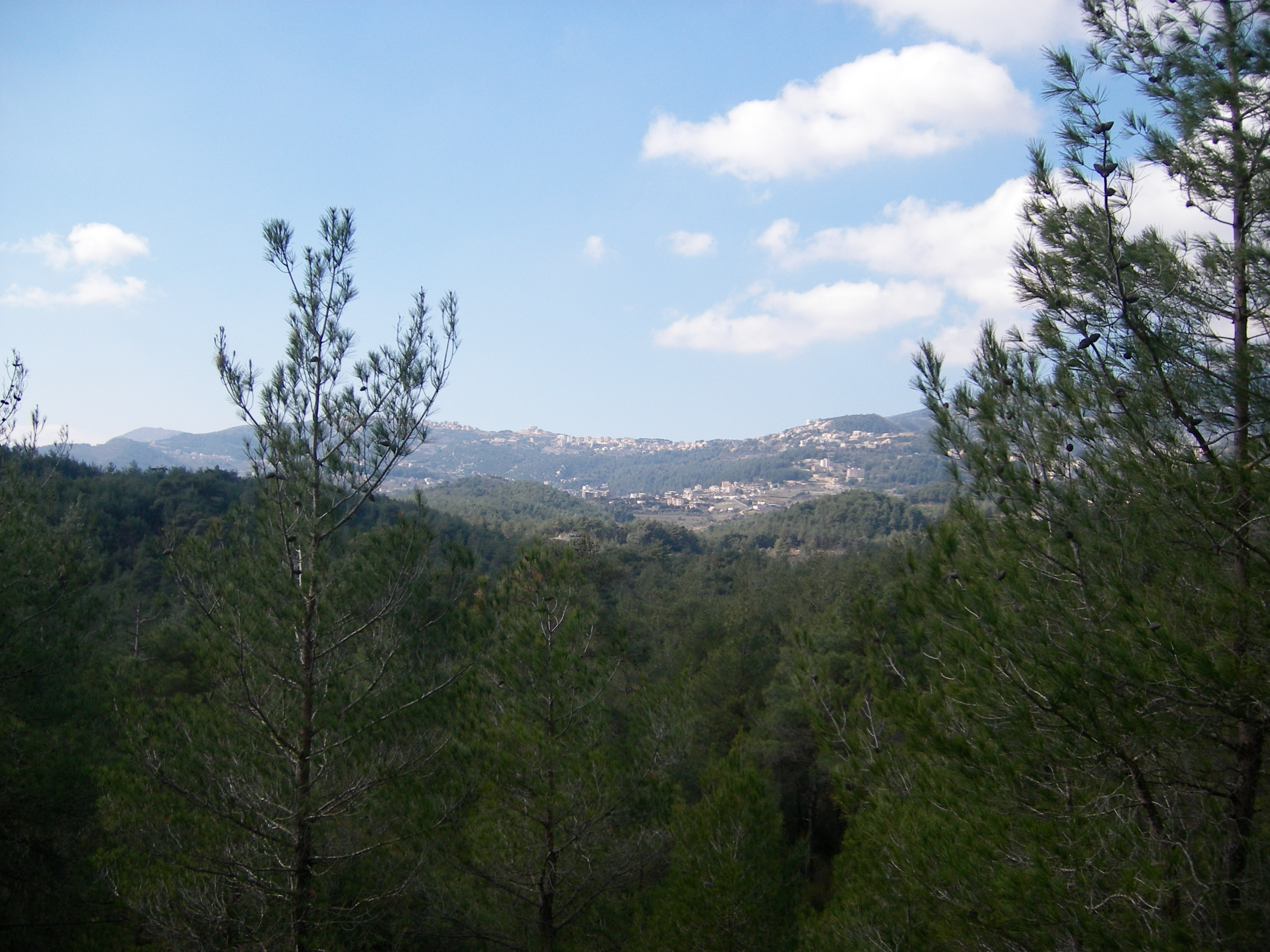
Kessab as seen from Yayladağı

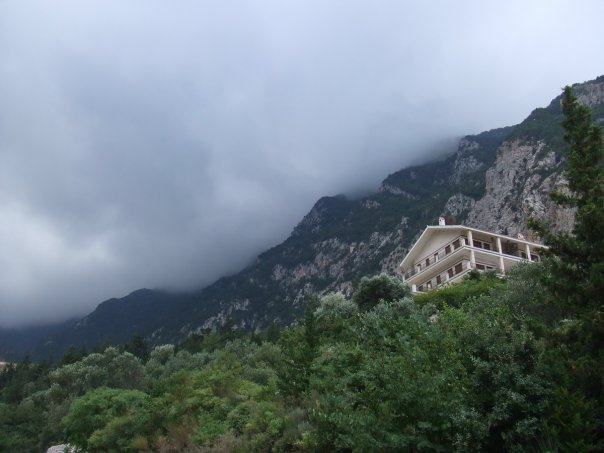
Mount Dyunag overlooking the Karadouran valley

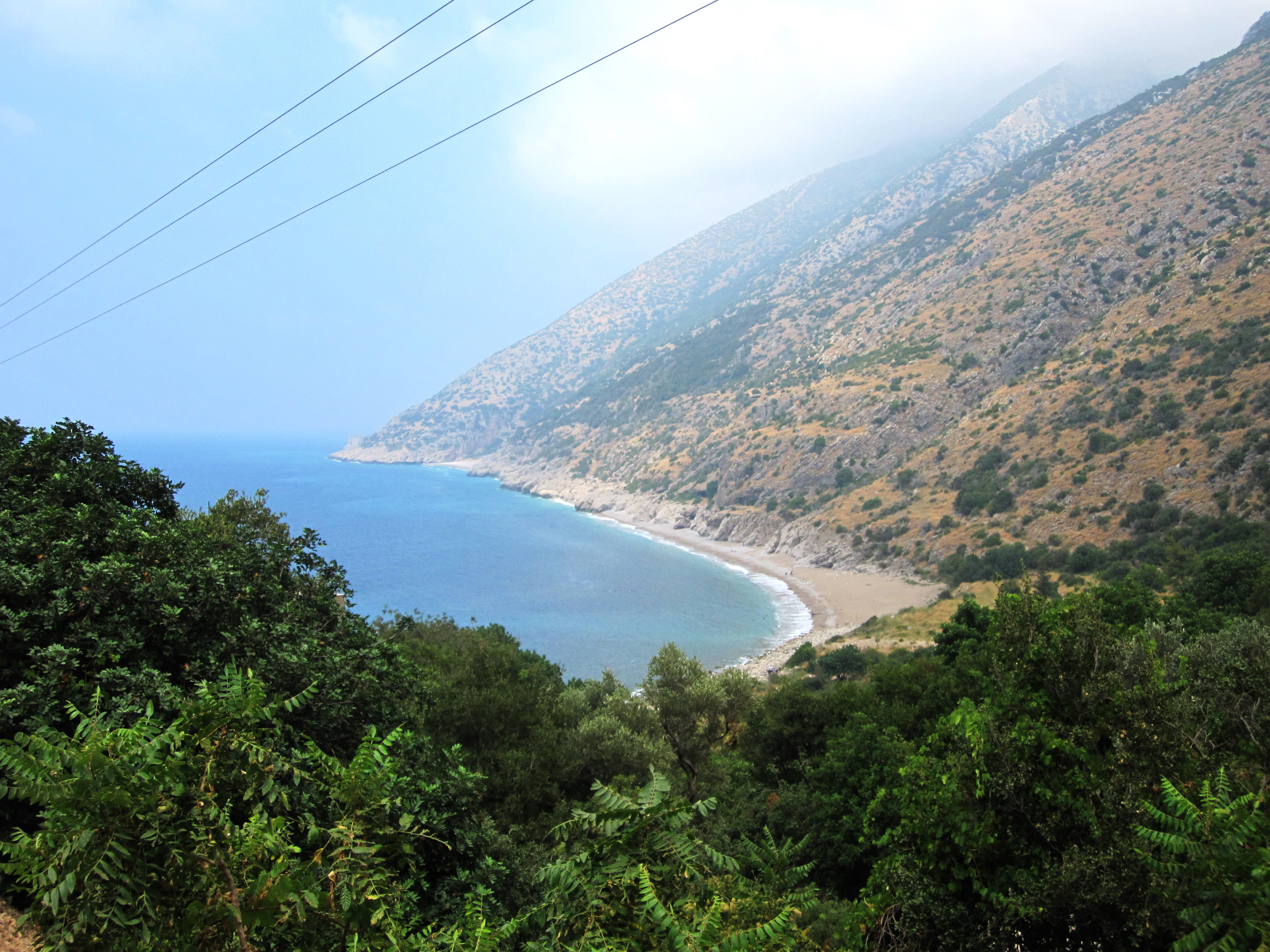
Karadouran beach on the Syrian-Turkish borderline

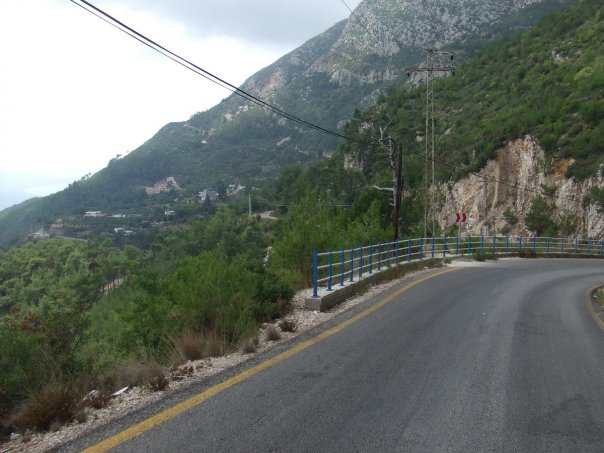
The Ekizolukh-Baghjaghaz road

== See also ==
- Armenians in Syria
- List of Armenian ethnic enclaves
