= Kessab Subdistrict =

Kessab Subdistrict ناحية كسب
- Subdistrict
- Location of Kessab Subdistrict within Latakia Governorate

- Location in Syria
- Country: Syria
- Governorate: Latakia
- District: Latakia District, Latakia Governorate
- Seat: Kessab

Kessab Subdistrict (Arabic: ناحية كسب) is a subdistrict of Latakia District in Latakia Governorate of northwestern Syria. The administrative centre is the town of Kessab.
