= Bena Properties =

Bena Properties (Arabic: عقارات بنا ) is the real estate investment and development arm of Cham Holding. Bena Properties is the largest Syrian private real estate company, established in July 2007, with a diverse portfolio consisting of a range of hotels and resorts, master-planned communities, and mixed-use centers with hospitality as the dominant component in its portfolio.

Bena Properties has partnered up with the Syrian government to help develop the local hospitality sector, and aims at becoming the partner-of-choice in hospitality projects for the government as well as regional and international investors.

Bena Properties is already active in four major Syrian cities: Damascus, Aleppo, Latakia and Tartous and is currently developing several projects in prime locations totaling in area approximately 3 million square meters.

Bena properties was sanctioned by the European Union in 2011 because it was "controlled by Rami Makhlouf; provides funding to the Syrian regime."

Following the fall of the Assad regime, the United States revoked it Syria sanctions effective July 1, 2025, moving Bena Properties from the OFAC Syria sanctions list to the new Promoting Accountibility for Assad and Regional Stabilization Sanctions (PAARSS) programme. As of 2025, Bena Properties remains on the UK sanctions list as an asset freeze target under Syria regime sanctions.
