= Mohammed Makhlouf =

Syrian businessman (1932–2020)

- محمد مخلوف
- Born: 19 October 1932; Bustan al-Basha, French Syria
- Died: 12 September 2020 (aged 87); Damascus, Syria
- Known for: Syrian Air
- Spouses: Ghada Adeeb Muhanna; Hala Tarif Al-Maghout
- Children: Rami (b. 1969); Hafez (b. 1971); Iyad (b. 1973); Ihab (b. 1973)
- Parent(s): Ahmed Makhluf; Sa'da Suleyman
- Relatives: Anisa Makhlouf (sister); Bashar al-Assad (nephew)

Mohammed Makhlouf (Arabic: محمد مخلوف; 19 October 1932 – 12 September 2020) was a Syrian businessman and a maternal uncle of former president Bashar al-Assad.

== Career ==
Mohammed was the brother of Anisa Makhlouf, who married Hafez al-Assad in 1957. He initially worked for Syrian Air, the national flag carrier. After his brother-in-law became president, he made a fortune both by managing government companies and in the private sector, including becoming general manager of the state-owned tobacco company as well as charging foreign companies a 10% commission on imported tobacco. In 1985, he became director of the Real Estate Bank of Syria (REB). He also became a partner in the "Al Furat Petroleum" company, whose shares were distributed among the Syrian government (65%), and the rest was owned by foreign companies, including Shell plc. His company obtained services related to oil fields from the Lead Contracting & Trading Company, which was owned by his son-in-law, Ghassan Muhanna. When Bashar al-Assad became president, his son Rami inherited his business empire.

In August 2011, he became subject to European Union sanctions, including travel bans and asset freezes, among individuals with close ties to the Syrian regime during the Syrian Civil War. He later appealed to the European General Court (EGC), claiming that the sanctions had violated his privacy and affected his standard of living, but the Council rejected his appeal.

In 2015, a leaked document from his HSBC bank account revealed that he had registered as an agent for Philip Morris, which owns the Marlboro brand, and as an exclusive agent for Mitsubishi Motors and Coca-Cola.

== Personal life ==
Makhlouf married Ghada Adeeb Muhanna. He had seven children with Ghada Adeeb Muhanna, including: Rami, Hafez, Iyad, Ihab, Shala, Kinda, and Sarah.

On 12 September 2020, he died at National University Hospital in Damascus, due to complications from COVID-19.
