= Hani al-Rahib =

Syrian novelist (1939–2000)

Hani Muhammad-Ali al-Rahib
- هاني محمد علي الراهب
- Born: 30 November 1939; Mashqita, Latakia Governorate, First Syrian Republic
- Died: 6 February 2000 (aged 60); Damascus, Syria
- Education: University of Exeter
- Alma mater: Damascus University
- Writing career
- Language: Arabic and English
- Period: 1961–2000

Hani Muhammad-Ali al-Rahib (Arabic: هاني محمد علي الراهب, romanized: Hānī Rāhib or Hānī Rāheb; 30 November 1939 – 6 February 2000) was a Syrian novelist and literary academic who wrote a number of distinguished novels. The Defeated was his first novel, which was published in 1961 when he was 22 years old. In the same year, he won the Al-Adab magazine literature award. His second novel was titled A Crack in a Long History (1970) then came A Thousand and Two Nights in 1977, followed in the early 1980s by The Epidemic, which some critics chose as one of the 100 most important Arab novels published in the twentieth century, according to Al-Faisal Magazine.

== Biography and career ==
=== Biography ===
Hani Muhammad Ali al-Rahib was born in the village of Mashqita in Latakia Governorate to a poor farming family. In 1957 he won a Damascus University scholarship where he studied English language and literature at the same university. After a while, he won a scholarship from the American University of Beirut, to obtain a master's degree. He then continued his higher education in the United Kingdom, obtaining a doctorate in English literature at the University of Exeter. After that, he was appointed as a professor at Damascus University, then, after graduating in 1962, he was appointed as a teacher in Idlib Governorate. Al-Rahib's works attracted political attention and his views created issues that resulted in his dismissal from the Arab Writers Union in 1969. In 1970, he critically withdrew from the Syrian Baath party. He had to leave Damascus and moved to Kuwait and taught at Kuwait University for a time before returning to Damascus in 1998 where he died as a result of a terminal illness at the age of 60.

Apart from his fictional works, al-Rahib was known as a literary and academic critic, published his non-literary works in various Arabic magazines, and translated many works from English to Arabic. His father, Shaykh Muhammad Ali, was deaf-mute but "was able to communicate with others with expressive gestures and knew how to read and write". He worked as a tailor in the city of Latakia for some time, for the local feudal most of the time. His mother Nuzha was illiterate. He spent his childhood in poverty and nature. Five of his sisters died by 1945, followed by his father in 1950 and his mother in 1955. He went to the city of Lattakia for his secondary and high school studies. Starting in 1973, he was appointed as a teacher and then as an assistant professor in the Department of English at Damascus University. He got married for the first time in 1966 and divorced after ten years. He married again in 1977 and had a successful married life. Actress Waha Al-Raheb was his niece, daughter of his diplomat brother Helal al-Raheb.

=== Literary career ===
According to Salah Salah, existentialism prevailed in al-Rahib's first novels, (1961) Al-Mahzūmūn and Sharkh fi tarikh tawil (1970), some of his novels were obsessed with formal experimentation and striving to invent new methods of narration, as in his 1977 novel Sharkh fi tarikh tawil and Alf layla wa-laylatān. The two novels seemed influenced by the French New Wave. Hot political issues were read in the two novels. In Alf layla wa-laylatān, he dealt with more disappointments that resulted from the defeat suffered in the Six-Day War.

He was expelled from the Arab Writers Union as far back as 1969, and was dismissed from his teaching position at Damascus University and demoted to a high school. In 1995, Rahib was forced out of the Arab Writers Union for a second time, claiming that he had called for the normalization of relations with Israel.

Al-Rahib wrote his last novel, I Have Drawn a Line on the Sand, in 1999 after Kuwait University, where he had been teaching, refused to renew his contract because of an article he wrote about Salman Rushdie's novel The Satanic Verses in which he called for freedom of expression for writers. His last novel generated negative reactions among some Kuwaiti writers. He returned to Damascus in the summer of 1998.

He also had many journalistic writings and translated many literary works, articles, and studies from English to Arabic. Numerous symposia were held on his works, which were also the subject of much critical and academic research inside and outside of Syria.

== Honors and awards ==
- Al Adab Magazine Prize for the novel The Defeated in 1961
- Arab Writers Union Award for the novel The Epidemic in 1981

== Hani the novelist ==
Hani Al-Rahib is considered a model for the renewed novelist. He worked on developing the Syrian narrative through his work and his tireless research on novelistic expression, a novel technique, and language economy. The linguistic tension for him derives its texture from a unified conception of language as being structural, still in the state of becoming, and on that Hani had said: "As long as the novel is an almost recent phenomenon in our literary heritage, it should contain a new linguistic and stylistic structure." His writing had a special effect on the Arabic novel, from structure to content, and formed a milestone in the development of the contemporary Arab novel.

=== One Thousand and Two Nights ===
In this novel, the writer tries to tell the story of 30 people who think they are on their own until the defeat of June hits them, and they discover that they are but a small part of a defeated society and the length of the defeat is 1000 years. The novel represented in its structure the shape of this society, and the time in it is contiguous or simultaneous. Hani said about the novel: " I felt confident enough to present the wreckage of a novel, I owe somewhat to the structure of A Thousand and One Nights, which tells a thousand tales".

=== The Hills ===
This novel was published in 1989 in Beirut. The writer didn't use conversations but used meanings instead. It talks about two opposite worlds, the world of myths, dreams, desires, and obsessions born of the torments and barrenness of society, as described by the novelist Hassan Hamid, and the world of real and known history. It is set in multiple timelines like the historical timeline (World war 1 and 2 and the year 1946) and the psychological timeline which is evident in many of the characters in the novel, then there is the mythical timeline (represented by Faidah) and there is what Al-Rahib called the timeline of no time, that is represented by Darwish. It's a novel that talks about Arabs, on the experience of progress in the contemporary history of the Arab nation, which is not specific to one Arab country, so he used the names of personalities and countries with special significance derived from the history of the region.

== His position on the Nobel Prize ==
When once asked about his flirting with the and his position on the Nobel Prize, Al-Rahib answered: "As for the Nobel Prize, I am not a candidate for it, and what I have written so far are eight novels, only two of them are worth reading and the other six are OK, and I also have two collections of short stories. This prize, if we took away the financial aspect, which is the only positive thing about it, is a very notorious prize due to the interference of politics in it away from cultural considerations, and in particular its promotion of imperialist and capitalist values that do not suit me as the Arab who is proud of my heritage and civilization." His important translations, and his interest in Zionist literature and studying it in a very deep way was the preoccupation of his thought, literature, and life.

== Bibliography ==
=== Novels ===
- Arabic: المهزومون, romanized: al-Mahzūmūn, lit. 'The Defeated', 1961, Beirut
- Arabic: شرخ في تاريخ طويل, romanized: Sharkh fī tārīkh ṭawīl, lit. 'A Crack in a Long History or Rupture in a Long History', 1970
- Arabic: ألف ليلة وليلتان, romanized: Alf layla wa-laylatān, lit. 'One Thousand and Two Nights' , 1977
- Arabic: الوباء, romanized: al-Wabāʼ, lit. 'The Epidemic', 1981
- Arabic: بلد الواحد هو العالم, romanized: Balad wāḥid huwa al-ʻālam, lit. 'One Country is the World', 1985, Damascus
- Arabic: التلال, romanized: al-Tilāl, 1988, Beirut
- Arabic: خضراء كالمستنقعات, romanized: Khaḍrāʼ ka-al-mustanqaʻāt, lit. 'Green as the Swamps', 1992, Beirut
- Arabic: خضراء كالحقول, romanized: Kadra' ka-al-huqul, lit. 'Green as the Fields', 1993
- Arabic: خضراء كالبحار, romanized: Khaḍrāʼ ka-al-biḥār, lit. 'Green as the Oceans', 1999
- Arabic: رسمت خطًّا في الرمال, lit. 'I Have Drawn a Line on the Sand', 1999, Beirut

=== Short stories ===
- Arabic: المدينة الفاضلة, romanized: al-Madīnah al-fāḍilah, lit. 'Ideal city', 1969, Damascus
- Arabic: جرائم دون كيشوت, romanized: Jarāʼim Dūn Kīshūt, lit. 'Don Quixote's Crimes', 1978
- Arabic: خصراء كالعلقم، سمسمة وقصص أخرى, lit. 'Khaḍrāʼ ka-al-ʻalqam, simsimah : wa-qiṣaṣ ukhrá', 2000, Beirut

Non-fiction:

- Arabic: الشخصية الصهيونية في الرواية الإنجليزية, romanized: Shakhṣīyah al-Ṣihyūnīyah fī al-riwāyah al-Inkilīzīyah, lit. 'The Zionist character in the English nove', 1974
- Arabic: منظور واحد وخمسة مؤلفين, 1979
- Arabic: بهجة الاكتشاف: رسائل نزار قباني وعبد الوهاب البياتي وهاني الراهب إلى بسام فرنجية, 2003
