= Latakia District =

Latakia District منطقة اللاذقية
- District
- Map of Latakia District within Latakia Governorate
- Coordinates (Latakia): 35°32′N 35°47′E
- Country: Syria
- Governorate: Latakia
- Seat: Latakia
- Subdistricts: 7 nawāḥī

Area
  - Total: 971.61 km^{2} (375.14 sq mi)

Population (2004)
  - Total: 526,888
  - Density: 542.28/km^{2} (1,404.5/sq mi)
- Geocode: SY0600

Latakia District (Arabic: منطقة اللاذقية, romanized: manṭiqat al-Lādhiqīyah) is a district of the Latakia Governorate in northwestern Syria. The administrative centre is the city of Latakia. At the 2004 census, the district had a population of 526,888.

Agriculture has remained the most important economic sector in the province, with citrus fruits, apples, and olives being the main cash crops. Tourism mostly from the Persian Gulf States is also a major source of income for the inhabitants during the summer season.

== Sub-districts ==
The district of Latakia is divided into seven sub-districts or nawāḥī (population as of 2004):

- Latakia Subdistrict (ناحية اللاذقية): population 424,392.
  - Main localities: Sqoubin, Burj al-Qasab, Baksa, Sitmarkho, Sinjwan, al-Shamiyah, Al-Qanjarah, Kirsana and Mushayrafet al-Samouk.
- Al-Bahluliyah Subdistrict (ناحية البهلولية): population 17,532.
  - Main localities: Al-Jandiriyah.
- Rabia Subdistrict (ناحية ربيعة): population 8,214.
- Ayn al-Baydah Subdistrict (ناحية عين البيضة): population 30,959.
  - Main localities: Burj Islam, al-Shabatliyah, Salib al-Turkman, al-Safsaf and Mashqita.
- Qastal Ma'af Subdistrict (ناحية قسطل معاف): population 16,784.
  - Main localities: Umm al-Tuyour, al-Badrusiyah, Balloran and Zighrin.
- Kessab Subdistrict (ناحية كسب): population 1,927.
- Hanadi Subdistrict (ناحية هنادي): population 27,080.
  - Main localities: Al-Bassah, al-Shir, al-Sanawbar and Fideo.
