= Garbi =

Garbi may refer to:

== People ==
- Joly Garbi, Greek actress
- Katy Garbi, Greek singer
- Nabil Al-Garbi, Yemeni middle-distance runner

== Places ==
- Garbi (mountain), mountain in Djibouti

== See also ==
- Garbis, a given name and surname
