= Waha Al-Raheb =

Syrian-Egyptian actress and filmmaker (born 1960)

- Born: 27 April 1960 (age 66); Cairo
- Citizenship: Egypt
- Education: Paris 8 University
- Occupations: actress and filmmaker
- Notable work: Dreamy Visions (2003)

Waha Al-Raheb (born 1960) is a Syrian-Egyptian actress and filmmaker. She wrote and directed Dreamy Visions (2003), the first Syrian feature film by a woman.

== Life ==
Waha Al-Raheb was born to Syrian parents on April 27, 1960 in Cairo. The daughter of a diplomat, Al-Raheb was educated internationally. She studied at the Academy of Fine Arts in Damascus before studying film at Paris 8 University, with a thesis on the role of women in Syrian cinema from 1963 to 1986.

Novelist Hani al-Rahib (1939 – 2000) was her paternal uncle.

== Filmography ==
=== As director (مخرج) ===
- رؤى حلمة (Ruaa Halema, Dreamy Visions), 2003.
