= George Haswani =

Syrian-Russian businessman (born 1946)

- جورج حسواني
- Born: George Haswani; 29 September 1946 (age 79); Yabroud, Syria
- Citizenship: Syrian, Russian
- Occupation: Businessman

George Haswani (Arabic: جورج حسواني, born 29 September 1946) is a Syrian-Russian businessman with close ties to the former government of Bashar al-Assad. He owns the HESCO Engineering and Construction Company, a major engineering, construction and natural gas production company operating in Syria.

== Biography ==
Not much information on Haswani's life is public, and what little exists does not explain how he acquired his fortune. A Greek Catholic businessman from the city of Yabroud, he obtained a doctorate from the then-Soviet Union in 1979. This was funded a grant from the Syrian Ministry of Higher Education, for which he worked as a professor in the Faculty of Mechanical and Electrical Engineering. He then was appointed director of the Baniyas refinery for a short period, a position that he left to establish HESCO. With Bashar al-Assad presiding over the country in 2000, he emerged as one of the heads of oil and gas in Syria.

== Activities in Syria ==
Haswani was a mediator in the deal to free nuns in March 2015. Through close friendship with Syrian President Bashar al-Assad and others from his family, Haswani has a great deal of influence that he uses to win large contracts in oil and gas projects, such as Tweenan gas (the North Central Region gas project) and the Arab gas pipeline project. Haswani obtained 120 million euros from the ministry of oil, as compensation for equipment, machinery, and equipment that were subjected to looting and vandalism. The ministry paid this sum under the insurance clause in the contract signed between the two parties, after the site of the Tuenan gas project came out of the government's control in early 2013. Rebels (from the Qais Al-Qarni Brigade and the Al-Nusra Front) took over the Twinan gas project in January 2013. They secured the Syrian and Russian engineers for their lives, so they continued to develop the project. In 2014, the Syrian newspaper Tishreen reported the exact details of Jabhat al-Nusra's takeover of the project. In 2015, the project fell into the hands of ISIL, which continued to secure Syrian and Russian engineers in exchange for the project's gas production to go to the Aleppo power plant, which ISIL controls, and the rest to Homs and Damascus. According to Abu Khaled, from the opposition Qais al-Qarni Brigade, George Haswani struck a deal with ISIL to share the proceeds of the Tuinan project. The agreement allowed project employees to change their work shifts through a military base of the Syrian army in Hama Governorate. Under the deal, the Syrian government will get 50 megawatts of electricity, ISIL will get 70 megawatts plus 300 barrels of oil condensate, and HESCO company pays ISIL $50,000 monthly to protect the equipment.

For his role in that agreement, Haswani was sanctioned by the US Treasury, EU, and UK in 2015.

== Links to 2020 Beirut explosion ==
As of January 2021, Syrian businessmen, including Mudalal Khoury and George Haswani, are possibly linked to the 2020 Beirut explosion. On 28 January 2021, Haswani denied any links to the explosion, which killed 207 people. His company and the Savaro company involved in the explosion are both registered under Interstatus, a Cypriot company.

== Russia ==
Youssef Arbash, the son-in-law of George Haswani, runs his Moscow office. Haswani enjoys close ties with the top economic and political circles in Russia, which made him Russia's favorite oil man in Syria. In Iraq, Algeria, the UAE and Sudan, HESCO has entered into remarkable business partnerships with Russian Stroytransgas owned by Russian billionaire Gennady Timchenko, who is closely affiliated with Russian President Vladimir Putin. Haswani claims he played a large role in persuading the Russian company to continue its projects after international sanctions decision against foreign companies operating in Syria. To date, more than 50 Russian employees work in the company's offices in Damascus.
