= Hafez Makhlouf =

Syrian brigadier general (born 1971)

- حافظ مخلوف

Head of Damascus Branch of General Intelligence Directorate
- In office 2011–2014

Personal details
- Born: 2 April 1971 (age 55) Damascus, Syria
- Party: Syrian Regional Branch of the Arab Socialist Ba'ath Party
- Relations: Rami Makhlouf (brother); Iyad Makhlouf (brother); Ihab Makhlouf (brother); Bashar al-Assad (cousin); Atef Najib (cousin)
- Parent(s): Mohammed Makhlouf; Ghada Adib Mhanna

Military service
- Allegiance: Ba'athist Syria
- Branch/service: Syrian Arab Army
- Years of service: 1992–2025
- Rank: Brigadier General
- Unit: General Intelligence; Military Intelligence; Republican Guard
- Battles/wars: Syrian civil war

Hafez Mohamad Makhlouf (Arabic: حافظ مخلوف; born 2 April 1971), also known as Hafez Makhlouf, is a Syrian brigadier general and intelligence officer who headed the Damascus branch of the Syrian General Intelligence Directorate. He was a member of former Syrian president Bashar al-Assad's inner circle of close supporters.

== Early life ==
Makhlouf was born in Damascus on 2 April 1971. He is a maternal cousin of former Syrian president Bashar al-Assad and the brother of Rami Makhlouf, a leading businessman in Syria. He is also a cousin of Atef Najib, former political security chief in the city of Daraa. Makhlouf was commissioned into the Republican Guard in 1992 and was a close friend of Bassel al-Assad, the elder brother of Bashar al-Assad. Makhlouf was injured in the high-speed car crash in 1994 that resulted in Bassel's death.

== Career ==
Makhlouf was a Colonel of the Army and the head of Section 40 at the General Security Directorate's Internal Branch (251) until 2014. In late 2014, he was transferred to GID headquarters. In November 2014, Col. Hafez Makhlouf also met with Egyptian President Abdel Fattah el-Sisi in Cairo. In 2017, he was promoted to brigadier general and entrusted with relations with the Iranian intelligence services and the Lebanese Hezbollah. In 2018, Brig. Gen. Hafez Makhlouf returned to his post in the GID, overseeing import of weapons into Syria from Russia and Iran.

== Controversy ==
=== Sanctions ===
Makhlouf was sanctioned by the US Department of the Treasury in 2007 for "undermining the sovereignty of Lebanon or its democratic processes and institutions." The sanctions called for freezing "any assets the designees may have located in the United States", and prohibited U.S. persons from engaging in transactions with these individuals". Makhlouf was further sanctioned in 2011 by the United States in May, the EU in September. In November 2011 the Arab League imposed a travel ban on him.

=== Money laundering allegations ===
Swiss authorities froze Hafez Makhlouf's account of about 3 million euros in a Geneva bank for suspected money laundering in 2011. In February 2012, Makhlouf won a legal bid to unfreeze SFr 3 million ($3.3 million) held in bank accounts in Switzerland after he appealed, saying it predated sanctions. However, his legal bid to enter Switzerland to meet with his lawyers was rejected by Switzerland's supreme court at the end of 2011.

Hafez Makhlouf reportedly bought £31 million in Moscow property through the financing network of Syrian-Russian businessman Mudalal Khoury.

== Reports on death, and relocating to Belarus ==
On 18 July 2012, Al Arabiya reported that Makhlouf was killed in a bombing which targeted a meeting of the Central Crisis Management Cell (CCMC) at Syria's National Security headquarters in Damascus. Other sources, however, indicated that he was only wounded in the attack.

In September 2014, multiple sources reported that he had relocated to Belarus with his wife. Earlier in the month, Makhlouf had been removed from his powerful intelligence post in Damascus but pro-government sources said at the time that it was a "routine" move. Joshua Landis, a U.S. expert on Syria, tweeted that Makhlouf had left Syria and that he and his brother Ihab had removed Assad’s photo from their Facebook pages and WhatsApp profiles.

== See also ==
- Al-Assad family
