= Mudalal Khoury =

Syrian-Russian businessman (born 1957)

- مدلل خوري
- Born: July 18, 1957 (age 68); Homs, Syria
- Other names: Mudalal Khuri, Mudallal Khoury, Mudalal Mtanyus Khuri
- Citizenship: Syria; Russia
- Family: Imad Khoury (brother)

Mudalal Khoury (Arabic: مدلل خوري; born 18 June 1957) also known as Mudallal Khuri, is a Syrian-Russian businessman and financier with close ties to the Syrian government of Bashar al-Assad.

== Business activities ==
Mudalal Khoury is linked to four companies, Balec Ventures, the sanctioned firm Argus Construction, and Tredwell Marketing and Armas Marketing.

== Controversies ==
In 2020, an investigation by Global Witness uncovered a money laundering operation run by Mudalal Khoury that assisted the Syrian government in avoiding sanctions and purchasing supplies.

=== Sanctions ===
The US Treasury sanctioned Mudalal Khoury in 2015 for "an attempted procurement of ammonium nitrate in late 2013." Savaro Ltd., the trading firm which procured chemicals in 2013 that exploded in the 2020 Beirut port blast, shared a London address with companies linked to Syrian businessmen George Haswani, Mudalal and Imad Khoury.

The Council of the European Union sanctioned Khoury on 23 June 2025 for "providing financial, technical and material support for serious human rights violations or abuses, in particular crimes against humanity", relating to him using front companies used for the Assad regime's chemical and ballistic weapons programs. On 19 December 2025, he was sanctioned by the United Kingdom for his involvement in the March 2025 clashes and "historic violence committed during the Syrian Civil War".
