= Al-Bahluliyah =

Town in northwestern Syria

Al-Bahluliyah البهلولية
- Town
- Location within Syria
- Coordinates: 35°38′2″N 35°57′22″E
- Country: Syria
- Governorate: Latakia
- District: Latakia
- Subdistrict: al-Bahluliyah

Population (2004 census)
  - Total: 4,665
- Time zone: UTC+2 (EET)
  - Summer (DST): UTC+3 (EEST)

Al-Bahluliyah (Arabic: البهلولية) is a town in northwestern Syria, administratively part of the Latakia Governorate, located north of Latakia. Nearby localities include Al-Shamiyah and Burj Islam to the west, Sitmarkho and al-Qanjarah to the southwest and al-Haffah to the southeast. According to the Syria Central Bureau of Statistics, al-Bahluliyah had a population of 4,665 in the 2004 census. Its inhabitants are predominantly Alawites.

Several towns and municipalities are affiliated with Al-Bahluliyah, including: Al-Bahluliyah Municipality, Al-Zobar Municipality, and Fadra Municipality. Not only that; a number of villages are affiliated with this municipality, including Al-Rastin, Salib Al-Bahluliyah, Al-Qarama, Al-Rafi’a, Ain Al-Safsaf, Sher Al-Kharab, Ras Awj, and Da’tour Al-Bahluliyah. The population of Fadra village is about 2,500 people. It is a small village affiliated with Al-Bahluliyah District. It has a municipality affiliated with the villages of Al-Karkit and Srna, with a total population of more than 5,000 people.
