= Garbis Kortian =

Austrian philosopher and political theorist

Garbis Kortian (Armenian: Կարպիս Գորդեան; February 15, 1938 – August 23, 2009) was a philosopher and political theorist.

Kortian was born to an Armenian family in Kessab, Mandatory Syria on February 15, 1938. He acquired his PhD in philosophy from the University of Vienna in 1966; his dissertation was on Wilhelm von Humboldt. Kortian taught at Université de Montréal from 1968 to 1995 and, sporadically, at UC Berkeley, McGill University, Université Laval, Balliol College, Oxford, and Academy of Fine Arts Vienna. He was one of the founders of the Zoryan Institute, a non-profit organization based in Toronto, Canada. He died in Vienna, Austria. He spoke Armenian, French, German, and English. His philosophical work was mostly written in French and German. He was married with 2 children.

Kortian was deeply influenced by Max Weber. He is best known for his 1979 book Métacritique, originally published in French and published in English in 1980 by Cambridge University Press. The book is expository in its content and shows that the meta-epistemology of Jürgen Habermas originated in German idealism, especially from Hegel's critique of Kant, and from Marx's critique of Hegel. Kortian also wanted to introduce it in contrast with positivist philosophy. The book is a reconstruction of Habermas's statement elaborated in his 1968 book Knowledge and Human Interests. The book was praised by Gillian Rose.
