= Iyad Makhlouf =

Syrian intelligence officer and businessman

- إياد مخلوف

Major in General Security Directorate
- President: Bashar al-Assad

Personal details
- Born: 21 January 1973 (age 53) Damascus, Syria
- Party: Ba'ath Party
- Relations: Hafez Makhlouf (brother); Rami Makhlouf (brother); Ihab Makhlouf (twin brother); Anisa Makhlouf (aunt); Bashar al-Assad (cousin); Atef Najib (cousin)
- Parent(s): Mohammed Makhlouf; Ghada Adib Mhanna

Military service
- Allegiance: Ba'athist Syria
- Branch/service: Syrian Arab Army
- Rank: Major
- Unit: Military Intelligence

Iyad Makhlouf (Arabic: إياد مخلوف; born 21 January 1973), also known as Eyad Makhlouf, is a former major in the Syrian General Intelligence Directorate, a brother of Syrian businessman Rami Makhlouf and maternal cousin of former Syrian President Bashar al-Assad.

He is sanctioned by the European Union, US Treasury, and UK Treasury for violence against the civilian population during the Syrian civil war, and for helping Rami Makhlouf or the Syrian government evade sanctions.

Shortly after the Fall of Damascus in 2024, Makhlouf was injured in a shooting that killed his twin brother Ihab and his mother Ghada.
