= Ihab Makhlouf =

Syrian businessman (1973–2024)

- إيهاب مخلوف
- Born: 21 January 1973
- Died: 8 December 2024 (aged 51); Damascus, Syria
- Other names: Ehab Makhlouf
- Known for: Syriatel
- Parent(s): Mohammed Makhlouf; Ghada Adib Mhanna
- Relatives: Hafez Makhlouf (brother); Rami Makhlouf (brother); Iyad Makhlouf (twin brother); Anisa Makhlouf (aunt); Bashar al-Assad (cousin); Atef Najib (cousin)

Ihab Makhlouf (Arabic: إيهاب مخلوف; 21 January 1973 – 8 December 2024), also known as Ehab Makhlouf, was a Syrian businessman, a brother of businessman Rami Makhlouf, intelligence officer and businessman Iyad Makhlouf and maternal cousin of former President Bashar al-Assad.

Makhlouf was sanctioned by the European Union, U.S. Treasury, and UK Treasury for violence against the civilian population during the Syrian uprisings, and for helping Rami Makhlouf or the Syrian government evade sanctions.

== Business activities ==
Ihab Makhlouf was the vice-chairman of Syriatel, the Syrian mobile phone company owned by his brother Rami Makhlouf. He resigned from Syriatel in 2020 when his brother Rami Makhlouf fell into dispute with the Syrian government, pledging loyalty to the Bashar al-Assad government.

In 2020 the Syrian government awarded Ihab Makhlouf and his partner Kuwaiti businessman and former MP Abdul-Hamid Dashti a contract to operate Syria's duty-free shops.

== Death ==
On 7 December 2024, amidst the opposition offensives that were rapidly dismantling the Ba'athist regime, Assad called Makhlouf to assure him that there was nothing to worry about, as the Saudis and Emiratis would force the rebels to halt their advance. Hours later, Assad fled to Russia. Meanwhile, Makhlouf was shot to death as he and a number of others, including his brother Iyad, were trying to flee Damascus after the city's fall into Syrian opposition hands; Iyad was wounded in the shooting.
