= Amar Makhloufi =

Algerian politician

Amar Makhloufi (born 17 November 1943) was the Algerian Minister for Energy and Industry in the 1995 government of Mokdad Sifi. He replaced Ahmed Benbitour. He is a former engineer at SONATRACH.
