= Al-Qanjarah =

Al-Qanjarah القنجرة
- Village
- Location within Syria
- Coordinates: 35°34′57″N 35°48′57″E
- Country: Syria
- Governorate: Latakia Governorate
- District: Latakia District
- Nahiyah: Latakia

Population (2004 census)
  - Total: 4,142
- Time zone: UTC+2 (EET)
  - Summer (DST): UTC+3 (EEST)

Al-Qanjarah (Arabic: القنجرة) is a town in northwestern Syria, administratively part of the Latakia Governorate, located north of Latakia. Nearby localities include al-Shamiyah and Kirsana to the north, Burj al-Qasab to the west, Sitmarkho to the east, Baksa and Sqoubin to the south. According to the Syria Central Bureau of Statistics, Al-Qanjarah had a population of 4,142 in the 2004 census. Its inhabitants are predominantly Alawites.
