= Al-Badrusiyah =

Town in northwestern Syria

Coordinates: 35°53′14″N 35°53′19″E

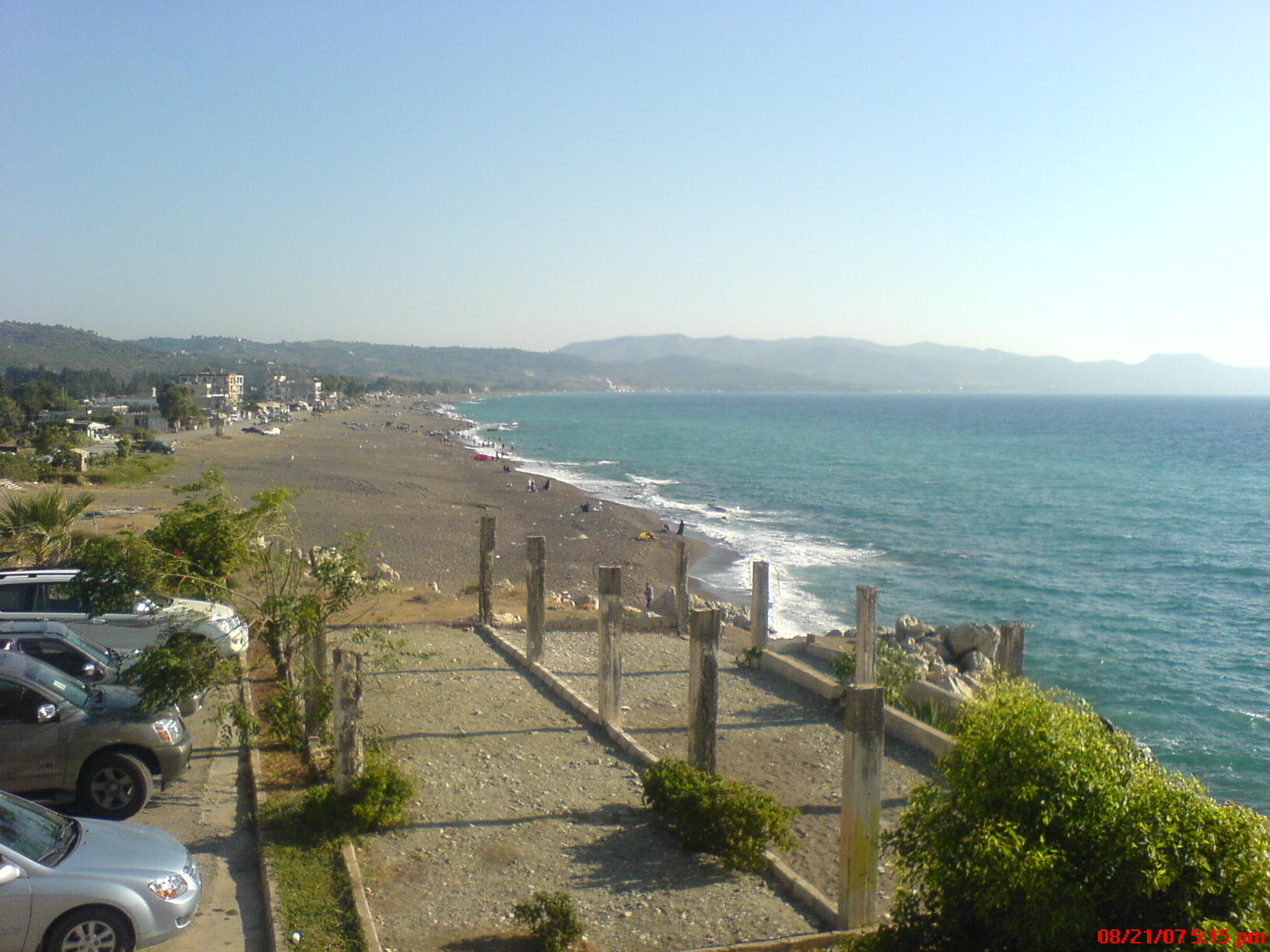
Badrusiyeh Beach

Al-Badrusiyah or El-Badrusiyeh (Arabic: البدروسية) is a town in northwestern Syria, administratively part of the Latakia Governorate, located north of Latakia.

In the end of March 2014, clashes between the government army and the opposition during the Syrian civil war were taking place in Al-Badrusiyah.
