= Kirsana =

Kirsana كرسانا
- Village
- Location within Syria
- Coordinates: 35°37′5″N 35°49′38″E
- Country: Syria
- Governorate: Latakia Governorate
- District: Latakia District
- Nahiyah: Latakia

Population (2004 census)
  - Total: 5,499
- Time zone: UTC+2 (EET)
  - Summer (DST): UTC+3 (EEST)
- Climate: Csa

Kirsana (Arabic: كرسانا) is a town in northwestern Syria. Kirsana is administratively part of the Latakia Governorate, located north of Latakia. Nearby localities include Al-Shamiyah and Burj Islam to the north, Burj al-Qasab to the southwest and Sitmarkho to the south. According to the Syria Central Bureau of Statistics, Kirsana had a population of 5,499 in the 2004 census. Its inhabitants are predominantly Alawites.
