= Baksa, Syria =

Baksa بكسا
- Village
- Location within Syria
- Coordinates: 35°34′15″N 35°49′17″E
- Country: Syria
- Governorate: Latakia Governorate
- District: Latakia District
- Nahiyah: Latakia

Population (2004 census)
  - Total: 3,001
- Time zone: UTC+2 (EET)
  - Summer (DST): UTC+3 (EEST)
- Climate: Csa

Baksa (Arabic: بكسا) is a town in northwestern Syria, administratively part of the Latakia Governorate, located north of Latakia. Nearby localities include al-Shamiyah, Kirsana and al-Qanjarah to the north, Burj al-Qasab to the west, Sitmarkho to the east and Sqoubin to the south. According to the Syria Central Bureau of Statistics, Baksa had a population of 3,001 in the 2004 census. Its inhabitants are predominantly Alawites.
