= Ayn al-Bayda, Latakia =

Town in northwestern Syria

Ayn al-Bayda عين البيضة
- Town
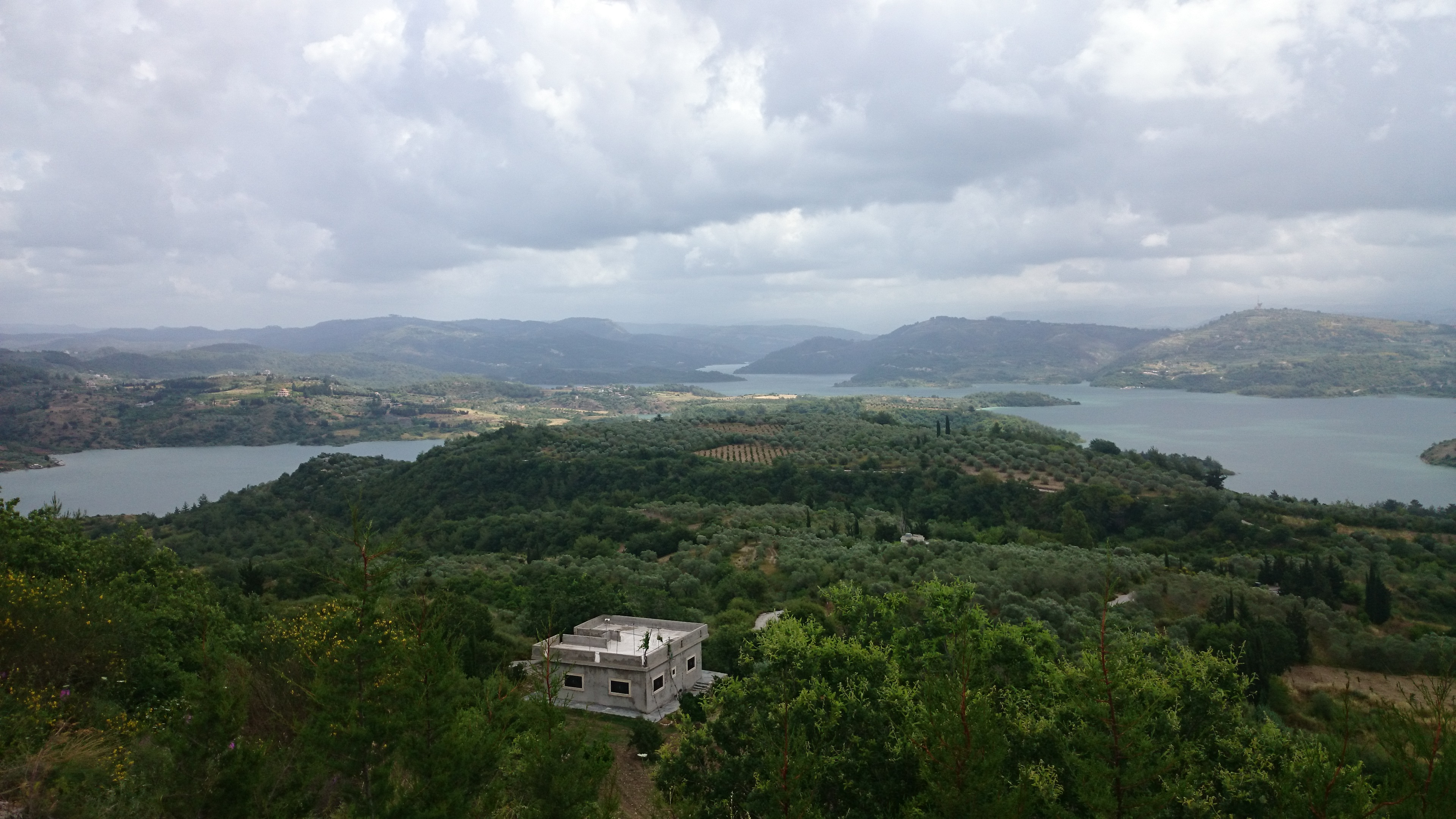

- Location within Syria
- Coordinates: 35°39′14″N 35°52′23″E
- Country: Syria
- Governorate: Latakia
- District: Latakia
- Subdistrict: Ayn al-Bayda

Population (2004 census)
  - Total: 1,629
- Time zone: UTC+2 (EET)
  - Summer (DST): UTC+3 (EEST)
- Climate: Csa

Ayn al-Bayda (Arabic: عين البيضة) is a town in northwestern Syria, administratively part of the Latakia Governorate, located north of Latakia. Nearby localities include Al-Shamiyah and Burj Islam to the west, al-Bahluliyah and Mashqita to the east and Mushayrafet al-Samouk to the southwest. According to the Syria Central Bureau of Statistics, Ayn al-Bayda had a population of 1,629 in the 2004 census. Its inhabitants are predominantly Alawites.

== Geography ==
=== Climate ===
The climate is mild, and generally warm and temperate. There is more rainfall in the winter than in the summer. The climate is considered to be Csa according to the Köppen-Geiger climate classification. The average annual temperature is 18.5 °C. In a year, the average rainfall is 1004 mm.

Climate data for Slinfah
| Month | Jan | Feb | Mar | Apr | May | Jun | Jul | Aug | Sep | Oct | Nov | Dec | Year |
|---|---|---|---|---|---|---|---|---|---|---|---|---|---|
| Mean daily maximum °C (°F) | 9.9 (49.8) | 10.8 (51.4) | 13.3 (55.9) | 16.6 (61.9) | 20.2 (68.4) | 23.9 (75.0) | 26.3 (79.3) | 26.9 (80.4) | 24.9 (76.8) | 21.1 (70.0) | 16.2 (61.2) | 11.4 (52.5) | 18.5 (65.2) |
| Mean daily minimum °C (°F) | 6.3 (43.3) | 6.8 (44.2) | 9 (48) | 11.7 (53.1) | 15.1 (59.2) | 19.3 (66.7) | 22.3 (72.1) | 22.5 (72.5) | 19.6 (67.3) | 15.6 (60.1) | 11.2 (52.2) | 7.7 (45.9) | 13.9 (57.1) |
| Average precipitation mm (inches) | 179 (7.0) | 160 (6.3) | 121 (4.8) | 59 (2.3) | 36 (1.4) | 9 (0.4) | 3 (0.1) | 5 (0.2) | 26 (1.0) | 66 (2.6) | 101 (4.0) | 239 (9.4) | 1,004 (39.5) |
Source: Climate-data.org, retrieved 12 August 2017

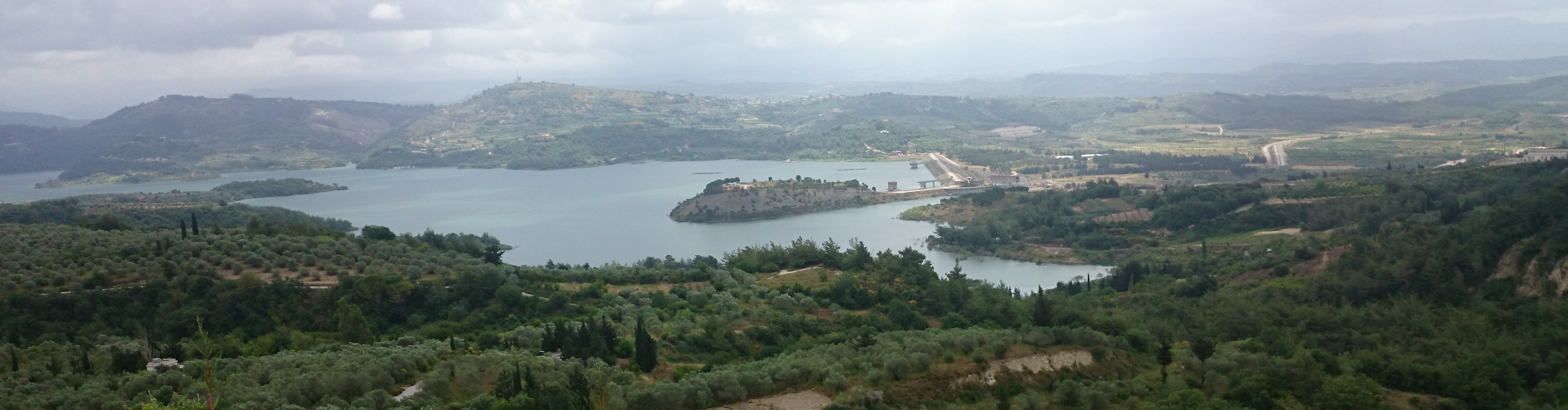
Panoramic view of Ayn al-Bayda
