= Rami Makhlouf =

Syrian businessman (born 1969)

- رَامِي مَخْلُوف
- Pronunciation: Rāmī Maḫlūf
- Born: 10 July 1969 (age 57); Jableh, Syria
- Citizenship: Syrian, Cypriot (2010–2011)
- Occupation: Businessman
- Spouse: Razan Othman
- Children: Mohammed Makhlouf; Ali Makhlouf
- Parent(s): Mohammed Makhlouf (1932–2020); Ghada Adib Mhanna
- Relatives: Hafez Makhlouf (brother); Iyad Makhlouf (brother); Ihab Makhlouf (brother); Anisa Makhlouf (aunt); Bashar al-Assad (cousin); Atef Najib (cousin)

Rami Makhlouf (Arabic: رَامِي مَخْلُوف, romanized: Rāmī Maḫlūf; born 10 July 1969) is a Syrian businessman and a maternal cousin of former president Bashar al-Assad. At the beginning of the Syrian civil war in 2011, he was considered one of Syria's richest and most powerful men. According to Syrian analysts, he was part of al-Assad's inner circle and no foreign company could do business in Syria at the time without his consent and partnership.

In 2016, he was reported to own Syriatel, the largest mobile phone network in Syria, along with other retail, banking and real estate companies. Makhlouf had a falling out with al-Assad in the spring of 2020 and was placed under house arrest, resulting in the arrest of many of his aides, along with the targeting of his companies by security forces. He was stripped of his shares in Syriatel, and the consortium he had established as the biggest investment vehicle in Syria was also taken off line. Makhlouf's remaining assets in Syria are considered to be insignificant compared to the billions he has transferred abroad on behalf of Bashar al-Assad.

Since the 2024 overthrow of al-Assad, ending the Syrian Civil War, Makhlouf has lived in exile on a private floor in a luxurious Radisson hotel in Moscow, Russia. Since fleeing Syria, Makhlouf has funded efforts seeking to revolt against the new Syrian government.

== Early life and education ==
Rami Makhlouf was born on 10 July 1969, and graduated with a degree in Civil Engineering from Damascus University in 1993. He is related to the Assad family through his aunt, Anisa Makhlouf, who was the wife of the late Syrian president Hafez al-Assad. Makhlouf's personal wealth accumulated abroad was estimated to be in excess of $10 billion in 2020.

== Business activities ==
Makhlouf is the main owner of Syriatel, one of two licensed mobile phone companies in Syria. Besides Syriatel, he is involved in real estate, banking, free-trade zones along the border with Lebanon, duty-free shops, and luxury departmental stores. According to the Financial Times, he is thought to control as much as 60% of the Syrian economy through his web of business interests.

Makhlouf was among a diverse group of connected insiders who monopolized the small, but growing, Syrian private sector in the 1990s. As President Hafez al-Assad prepared for his son's succession, the distribution of assets from privatization began to shift clearly in favor of the Makhloufs. Assad believed the Makhlouf family could be relied upon to support Bashar without reserve in the uncertain political environment that would follow upon his death, unlike other insiders, who had close financial ties to billionaire Lebanese Prime Minister Rafiq Hariri, such as former Syrian Vice President Abdul Halim Khaddam. Rami and his brother Ihab therefore enjoyed easy access to opportunities such as an exclusive license to operate a network of duty-free retail shops, where a significant portion of goods were redistributed inside the country. By the time Bashar assumed power in 2000, Rami Makhlouf was well established.

Makhlouf is thought to have tried in 2004 to take over the Mercedes-Benz dealership in Syria by ensuring passage of a law denying Mercedes-Benz the right to import parts unless Makhlouf was made the exclusive agent for Mercedes-Benz in Syria. Mercedes-Benz wanted to keep Omar Sanqar & Sons (OSS), who had had the dealership since the 1960s. Mercedes-Benz ceased all activity in Syria until the dispute was resolved. The dispute was eventually resolved after two years and the Mercedes-Benz dealership is now once again controlled by Omar Sanqar & Sons.

Makhlouf's current business interests are extensive, which include business interests in Syria’s oil and gas industries, banking, construction and duty-free shops. He is the majority owner of Cham Holding which has investments in luxury tourism, restaurants, and real estate through Bena Properties. Cham Holding also controls Syrian Pearl Airlines, the first private airline to be allowed in the country. He is also invested in several private banks established in Syria, such as the International Islamic Bank of Syria, Al Baraka Bank, International Bank of Qatar, Cham Bank, and the Bank of Jordan in Syria; in insurance and financial services companies, such as Cham Capital. Like his father, Mohammed Makhlouf, he is active in the oil sector, via the British oil company Gulfsands Petroleum. He is also invested in real estate companies such as Sourouh, Fajr, Al Batra, and Al Hada'iq; in tourism companies such as Al Mada'in and in media companies such as the daily Al Watan, radio/television station Ninar and satellite station Dunya TV, advertising companies like Promedia; in education companies such as the Choueifat schools; in industry through the Eltel Middle East company; and in public works companies such as Ramak TP. Rami Makhlouf has extensive land holdings in the United States Virgin Islands, which were the subject of court litigation. Because of this litigation he transferred his U.S. holdings to his brother Ihab. The Makhloufs also have a monopoly on the import of tobacco into Syria. In 2008, the U.S. Treasury Department froze the U.S. assets and restricted the financial transactions of Rami Makhlouf.

Makhlouf maintains a close relationship with Bushra al-Assad, Bashar's older sister, and her late husband Assef Shawkat. He also operates a number of business projects in Lebanon with Maher al-Assad, Bashar's younger brother. There are reports of tensions between the two, which is thought to explain why parts of the Makhlouf business were shifted in 2005 to Dubai. Some observers believe the transfers were made because the Makhloufs were worried that they were going to be made the scapegoats of an anti-corruption propaganda campaign.

On 5 July 2012, it was reported that the Central Bank of the UAE ordered the banks and financial institutions to search for and submit details of any financial assets and transactions performed by the Syrian ruling elite, including Rami Makhlouf. This search was based on the decision of the Ministerial Council of the League of Arab States dated 27 November 2011, to impose multiple sanctions on Syria, and on and decisions issued by the European Union and the United States involving economic sanctions on Syria.

== Controversies ==
=== Accusations of corruption ===
In February 2008, the United States Department of the Treasury designated Makhlouf as a beneficiary and facilitator of public corruption in Syria. His influence and connections within the government have allowed him to control the issuance of certain types of profitable commodities contracts, it said. According to the US Treasury, "Makhlouf has manipulated the Syrian judicial system and used Syrian intelligence officials to intimidate his business rivals. He employed these techniques when trying to acquire exclusive licenses to represent foreign companies in Syria and to obtain contract awards." On 10 May 2011, the European Union placed sanctions on him for "bankrolling the government and allowing violence against demonstrators". Makhlouf's brother Hafez Makhlouf was until 2014 head of Syria's intelligence agency, the General Security Directorate.

Political observers generally accept that Makhlouf's great wealth is a result of his close family ties to the Syrian government. It is reported that Bashar al-Assad before he became president would during official meetings try to make business contacts for Rami. In leaked US diplomatic cables, Rami Makhlouf is described as a powerful government financer. Makhlouf has further been accused of illegally diverting Lebanese telephone calls through Syria with the help of businessman Pierre Fattouch for the benefit of Syriatel.

Makhlouf controlled three Syrian companies close to the government of Bashar Al-Assad – Maxima Middle East Trading, Morgan Additives Manufacturing and Pangates International. These companies used Mossack Fonseca shell companies registered in the Seychelles and British Virgin Islands to ease the pressure global sanctions put on his cousin's regime. He paid for the Syrian Air Force helicopter fuel through shell companies, for example. The US Treasury sanctioned Makhlouf, charging that Pangates had supplied the Assad government with a thousand tonnes of aviation fuel.

Makhlouf was able to continue unimpeded operations through the shell companies, since neither jurisdiction fell under US law; however the EU sanctions did affect the companies in the British Virgin Islands. HSBC told the law firm that the Swiss authorities had frozen Makhlouf's accounts, and that "they have had no contact with the beneficial owner of this company since the last 3 months". The Swiss Federal Administrative Court in 2015 rejected an appeal of the block on his use of an undisclosed sum in his Swiss accounts.

Makhlouf was seen by the rebels as a symbol of corruption in Syria. In Daraa during the Syrian Civil War, demonstrators called him a "thief". Syrian dissident Riad Seif was arrested and imprisoned for several years because of his criticism of Rami Makhlouf. Seif, a member of parliament and one of the most ardent critics of the Syrian government, became known outside of Syria because of his criticism of the government during the Damascus Spring of 2001. Despite several warnings from the Syrian government not to interfere, Seif began an anticorruption campaign in September 2001 against the way the two GSM mobile phone licenses were awarded, of which one to Maklouf's Syriatel. Shortly thereafter Seif lost his parliamentary immunity and was arrested and imprisoned for five years. United Nations observers at its Commission of Inquiry on the Syrian Arab Republic, set up in 2011, have documented "mass arrests by regime forces, leading to the enforced disappearance of large groups of fighting-age men."

Makhlouf was implicated in the leaked 2016 Panama Papers, which detailed his control over Syria's national industries. His name also surfaced as part of the Swissleaks investigation. Frederik Obermaier, an investigative reporter at the German newspaper Süddeutsche Zeitung, told Democracy Now!: "[Mossack Fonseca] realised that [Makhlouf] was the cousin, and they realised that he was sanctioned, and they realised that he's allegedly one of the financiers of the Syrian regime. And they said, 'Oh, there is this bank who still does business with him, so we should still keep with him, as well'."

=== Syrian civil war ===
Some opposition activists during the Syrian civil war accused Makhlouf of financing pro-government demonstrations both across Syria and abroad, by providing flags, meals and money for those participating. The tycoon insisted his businesses are legitimate and provide professional employment for thousands of Syrians. Opposition activists claim that Makhlouf finances the Syrian Electronic Army, and masterminded its move out of Syria to one of his Dubai companies.

On 9 May 2011, Makhlouf said that "if there is no stability here, there's no way there will be stability in Israel", then he added, "no way, and nobody can guarantee what will happen after, God forbid, anything happens to this regime", in an interview with The New York Times.

On 16 June 2011, Makhlouf stated that he would "quit the Syrian business scene". Syria Files examined by Al Akhbar showed that Makhlouf continued to invest in several banks during 2011 and 2012. In late January 2012, he bought about 15 times as many shares (by value) as he sold, buying £S 127,000,000 and selling £S 8,670,000 of shares, mostly in Qatar National Bank–Syria and Syria International Islamic Bank.

In summer 2019, Makhlouf's charitable network, the al-Bustan Association, was forced to shut down. It had previously supported the families of fallen soldiers and funded a militia of about 20,000 men. In December 2019, Syrian customs issued an order to freeze Beirut-registered Abar Petroleum Service SAL assets, including assets of Makhlouf, for violating import regulations by smuggling £S 1,920,000,000 worth of goods. Moreover, Makhlouf was also accused of smuggling oil into Syria, in breach of international sanctions. On 22 April 2020, Egyptian authorities seized 4 tonnes of hashish hidden in a cargo of milk cartons, related to a company owned by Makhlouf, in Port Said which was heading to Libya; however, he later claimed that the incident was a set-up aimed at "defaming" him.

=== Prosecution proceedings ===
On 1 May 2020, Makhlouf made an "unprecedented" public appeal to his cousin President Bashar al-Assad on Facebook, saying a "cadre of officials" were seeking to seize his assets, as he was pressured to hand over in excess of £S 130,000,000,000 due to tax evasion. Makhlouf, who was a part of President al-Assad's inner circle said he would pay the President himself but not the state. Two days later, he posted another video on Facebook, where he mentioned that Syrian security forces arrested some of his employees. However, speculations indicate that the Syrian first lady, Asma al-Assad, has been responsible for the whole plot, the reason was that "many businessmen loyal to Asma Assad competed with Makhlouf for control of diminishing resources, after the collapse of the Syrian pound, along with sanctions, made the space in which they compete narrow and difficult", according to Dr. Muhannad Al-Hajj Ali, a researcher at the Carnegie Middle East Center. In addition, the Syrian authorities might have targeted Makhlouf in order to find resources prior to the implementation of U.S. sanctions related to the Caesar Act.

On 17 May, Makhlouf posted another video on Facebook, where he mentioned rising pressure on him to hand over profits or might be arrested. On 19 May, the Syrian government seized all assets belonging to Makhlouf. On 21 May, a Syrian court placed a temporary travel ban on Makhlouf. On 25 June, the Syrian government terminated duty free contracts in all ports and border crossings with companies affiliated with Makhlouf.

=== Regime collapse and leadership of an insurrection from abroad ===
During the Syrian opposition offensives in the early days of December 2024, Makhlouf resurfaced after a year-long absence, accusing extremist groups of threatening civilians, claiming that these groups would not only kill people but also violate women and seize wealth if they reached their targets. During the fall of Damascus and dissolution of the Syrian government, Makhlouf fled Damascus on December 8, 2024.

In March 2025, in his first public statement on social media since the Assad regime’s fall, Rami Makhlouf condemned his cousin, Bashar al-Assad, saying: “Haven’t you, Mr. Fleeing President, already destroyed the country, divided it, ruined its army and economy, starved its people, and fled with money that, if distributed, would have ensured no one went hungry or poor?”

In April 2025, Makhlouf announced the formation of an armed militia called the "Elite forces", claiming that it aims to defend the Syrian coastal region against internal and external threats, promote social and economic revitalization within the coastal areas, establish a new political and security order in the region based on "justice, brotherhood, and tolerance", and cooperate with international actors to guarantee protection and oversight of the region.

By late 2025, investigative reporting by Reuters revealed that Makhlouf had relocated to Moscow, living under tight security on a private floor of a luxury hotel while directing renewed political and military activities from abroad. Operating through business agents in Russia, Lebanon, and the UAE, he financed fighters, equipment, and the reactivation of dormant command centers built by the former Syrian security apparatus. Working alongside ex–military intelligence chief Kamal Hassan, he sought control of fourteen underground coastal command rooms and associated weapons caches, with internal documents attributing tens of thousands of fighters to their networks, though these claims remained unverified. Despite these ambitions, Russia provided no formal backing, and Makhlouf's efforts faced skepticism among local Alawite communities as well as uncertainty over the sustainability of his funding and influence. In late December 2025, Makhlouf criticized Sheikh Ghazal Ghazal and other Alawite clerics for advocating federalism and protests, warning that such demands endangered the Alawite community and urging reliance on Russia rather than decentralization.

== Personal life ==
Makhlouf is married to Razan Othman. They have two sons, Mohammad and Ali Makhlouf.

Makhlouf's brother Ehab was shot on December 8, 2024, as he tried to flee Damascus in a Maserati, carrying millions of dollars in cash.

=== Other citizenships ===
Rami Makhlouf applied but failed to obtain Austrian citizenship from 2009 to 2011. In the meantime, he held Cypriot citizenship from 2010 to 2011, which was revoked when the civil war broke out in Syria.

=== Children's lifestyle ===
Rami Makhlouf's children have garnered controversy for their luxurious lifestyle. Ali Makhlouf, an Instagram celebrity with over 250,000 followers, caused controversy when he was spotted in Beverly Hills, California driving a Ferrari Spider in 2021. His son Ali Makhlouf was also seen with model and actress Michal Idan, an Israeli citizen which was a breach of Syrian law given the Israeli occupation of the Golan Heights. Rami Makhlouf's other son, Mohammed Makhlouf, was briefly detained in Syria after outrage over his luxury influencer lifestyle.

== See also ==
- Al-Assad family
- Syrian civil war
