= Burj al-Qasab =

Burj al-Qasab برج القصب
- Village
- Location within Syria
- Coordinates: 35°36′17″N 35°47′32″E
- Country: Syria
- Governorate: Latakia Governorate
- District: Latakia District
- Nahiyah: Latakia

Population (2004 census)
  - Total: 4,902
- Time zone: UTC+2 (EET)
  - Summer (DST): UTC+3 (EEST)
- Climate: Csa

Burj al-Qasab (Arabic: برج القصب) is a town in northwestern Syria, administratively part of the Latakia Governorate, located north of Latakia close to Ras Ibn Hani. Nearby localities include Al-Shamiyah and Burj Islam to the north, Kirsana to the northeast, Sitmarkho and al-Qanjarah to the east. According to the Syria Central Bureau of Statistics, Burj al-Qasab had a population of 4,902 in the 2004 census. Its inhabitants are predominantly Alawites. The ancient site of Ugarit sits on the tell east of the village.
