= Sqoubin =

Sqoubin سقوبين Saqubin
- Location within Syria
- Coordinates: 35°33′34″N 35°49′50″E
- Country: Syria
- Governorate: Latakia Governorate
- District: Latakia District
- Nahiyah: Latakia

Population (2004 census)
  - Total: 6,379
- Time zone: UTC+2 (EET)
  - Summer (DST): UTC+3 (EEST)

Sqoubin (Arabic: سقوبين, also spelled Saqubin) is a town in northwestern Syria, administratively part of the Latakia Governorate, located north of Latakia. Nearby localities include Baksa and al-Qanjarah to the north, Sitmarkho to the northeast, Burj al-Qasab to the northwest. According to the Syria Central Bureau of Statistics, Sqoubin had a population of 6,379 in the 2004 census. Its inhabitants are predominantly Alawites.
