= Sitmarkho =

Sitmarkho ستمرخو Sitt Markhu
- Village
- Location within Syria
- Coordinates: 35°35′10″N 35°51′3″E
- Country: Syria
- Governorate: Latakia Governorate
- District: Latakia District
- Nahiyah: Latakia

Population (2004 census)
  - Total: 2,341
- Time zone: UTC+2 (EET)
  - Summer (DST): UTC+3 (EEST)

Sitmarkho (Arabic: ستمرخو, also spelled Sitt Markhu) is a town in northwestern Syria, administratively part of the Latakia Governorate, located north of Latakia. Nearby localities include Kirsana and Mushayrafet al-Samouk to the north, Burj al-Qasab and Al-Qanjarah to the west. According to the Syria Central Bureau of Statistics, Sitmarkho had a population of 2,341 in the 2004 census. Its inhabitants are predominantly Alawites.
