= Bustan al-Basha =

Village in northwestern Syria

Bustan al-Basha بستان الباشا
- Village
- Location within Syria
- Coordinates: 35°25′N 35°56′E
- Country: Syria
- Governorate: Latakia
- District: Jableh
- Subdistrict: Jableh

Population (2004 census)
  - Total: 1,603
- Time zone: UTC+2 (EET)
  - Summer (DST): UTC+3 (EEST)

Bustan al-Basha (Arabic: بستان الباشا, also spelled Bistan al-Basha, lit. 'the Governor's Garden') is a village located along the Mediterranean coastline in northern Syria, part of the Latakia Governorate. It is situated southeast of Latakia and west of Qardaha. In the 2004 census Bustan al-Basha had a population of 1,603. Most of its inhabitants are Alawites and the village is home to the Makhlouf family who are related to the Assad family. According to Patrick Seale, Bustan al-Basha's residents were mostly aligned with Syrian Social Nationalist Party in the mid-20th-century.

== Bibliography ==
- Seale, Patrick (1990). Asad of Syria: The Struggle For the Middle East. University of California Press. ISBN 0520069765. "Bustan Basha."
