= Burj Islam =

Burj Islam برج اسلام
- Village
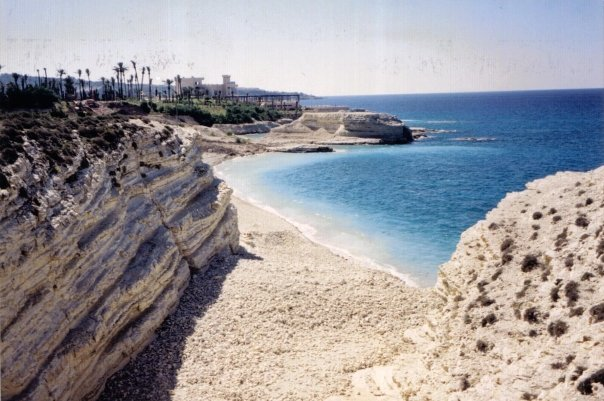
- Burj Islam beach

- Location in Syria
- Coordinates: 35°41′N 35°48′E
- Country: Syria
- Governorate: Latakia Governorate
- District: Latakia District
- Nahiyah: Ayn al-Bayda

Population (2004)
  - Total: 5,652
- Time zone: UTC+2 (EET)
  - Summer (DST): UTC+3 (EEST)
- Area code: 41
- Climate: Csa

Burj Islam (Arabic: برج اسلام) is a village in northwestern Syria, administratively part of the Latakia Governorate, located north of Latakia. Nearby localities include Salib al-Turkman to the north, al-Shabatliyah to the northeast, Ayn al-Bayda to the east and al-Shamiyah to the south. According to the Syria Central Bureau of Statistics, the village had a population of 5,652 in the 2004 census. Its inhabitants are predominantly Turkish-speaking Sunni Muslims from Turkmen ethnicity.

The village is a popular summer resort with a white rock beach.
