= Al-Shamiyah, Syria =

Al-Shamiyah الشامية
- Village
- Location within Syria
- Coordinates: 35°38′13″N 35°48′28″E
- Country: Syria
- Governorate: Latakia Governorate
- District: Latakia District
- Nahiyah: Latakia

Population (2004 census)
  - Total: 2,982
- Time zone: UTC+2 (EET)
  - Summer (DST): UTC+3 (EEST)

Al-Shamiyah (Arabic: الشامية) is a town in northwestern Syria, administratively part of the Latakia Governorate, located north of Latakia. Nearby localities include Burj Islam to the north, Burj al-Qasab and Kirsana to the south. According to the Syria Central Bureau of Statistics, Al-Shamiyah had a population of 2,982 in the 2004 census. Its inhabitants are predominantly Alawites.

== Syrian Civil War ==
On 15 June 2014, Syrian opposition forces targeted the village with artillery fire, killing at least one person.
