= Najran, Suwayda =

Najran نجران Nijran
- Village
- Location within Syria
- Coordinates: 32°50′46″N 36°26′48″E
- Grid position: 285/250
- Country: Syria
- Governorate: Suwayda
- District: Suwayda
- Subdistrict: Mazraa

Population (2004 census)
  - Total: 2,955
- Time zone: UTC+2 (EET)
  - Summer (DST): UTC+3 (EEST)

Najran (Arabic: نجران, also spelled Nijran) is a village in southern Syria lying south of the Lajat plain, administratively part of the Suwayda Governorate, located northwest of Suwayda. Nearby localities include Harran to the northwest, Ariqah to the northeast, ad-Duwayra and Qarrasa to the west, ad-Dour and Sami' to the southwest, al-Mazraa and al-Majdal to the south and Kafr al-Luhuf and Rimat al-Luhuf to the southeast. According to the Syria Central Bureau of Statistics (CBS), Najran had a population of 2,955 in the 2004 census. Its inhabitants are predominantly Druze, with a Sunni Muslim Bedouin minority.

== History ==
=== Byzantine and Islamic era ===
Najran takes its name from the South Arabian city of Najran, many of whose inhabitants, the Balharith, were expelled from the city in the 520s and settled the district of Trachonitis (the Lejah plain), then part of the Arabia Petraea province. They came under the protection of their ancient relatives, the Ghassanids.

In the Byzantine era, (late 4th–6th century), a church was built in Najran by Monophysite Arab Christians, likely from Najran in South Arabia. During the early Islamic era, the Christian community of Najran was expelled by Umar ibn al-Khattab, leading to some migrating to the Najran of Hauran.

In the early 13th century, the Byzantine-era church was visited by Syrian geographer Yaqut al-Hamawi, who hailed the structure's beauty and noted its mosaics and marble columns. He also wrote that the church was a votive shrine.

=== Ottoman era ===
In 1596, Najran appeared in Ottoman tax registers as being in the nahiya of Bani Miglad in the Qada Hawran. It had a population of 65 households and 25 bachelors, all Muslim. The villagers paid taxes on wheat, barley, summer crops, occasional revenues, goats and beehives; a total of 5,000 akçe.

Najran was settled by 200 Druze immigrant families from Mount Lebanon in 1685. The village had been previously abandoned by the Arab tribe Muqri al-Wahsh, although it still contained Christians. According to historians Hanna Abu Rashid and Bouron, Najran was the first place for the second wave of Mount Lebanon Druze to settle, while historian Sa'id Sghayar notes that two other villages in the Lejah plain were temporarily settled by this group of immigrants before Najran was chosen as a permanent residence. Historian Abu Shaqra described the Druze arrival at Najran:

As was the custom in such cases, the sheikh of Najran ordered the lighting of bonfires on the summit of the village ... then bonfires were lit as a signal of war on the summit of every village in Jabel Hawran ... In the morning [the Druzes] came to Najran from every village. The three thousand Lebanese [Druzes] were distributed over the different parts of Hawran.

In 1711 Najran, which had a castle, became the center of the al-Hamdan clan, who controlled five other villages in the Hauran.

In 1838, Edward Robinson was informed that Najran was a Catholic village, situated "in the Luhf, south of the Lejah".

In the early 19th century Christians were still the majority in Najran, with roughly 150 families. There were 50 Druze families. By the mid-19th century the Druze Abu Fakhr clan controlled Najran and two other villages. During this period, the Christian and Druze communities were roughly equal in population and the chief of the village was Qasem Abu Fakhr. Traveler Josias Leslie Porter visited in the 1850s and noted that Najran had "extensive ruins ... estimated at nearly two miles in circumference." The most significant of these was the Byzantine-era church, the remains of which consisted of two square-shaped towers with Greek inscriptions. One tower inscription contained the date 458 AD, while the other contained 564 AD. According to Porter, the ruins had functioned as a mosque in earlier times. By 1862 the Abu Fakhr chief was Ibrahim Abu Fakhr, who resided in Najran.

In October 1895 the Ottoman army based in nearby al-Shaykh Maskin launched an offensive against the Druze, attacking Najran along with Qarrasa and Ahira. About 45 Ottoman soldiers were killed and 65 were wounded as a result of resistance by the three villages.

=== Present day ===
At least 80 people are alleged to have been killed by government forces during the Southern Syria clashes in July of 2025.

== Religious buildings ==
- Maqam al-Khidr (Druze Shrine)

== See also ==
- Druze in Syria

== Bibliography ==
- Firro, Kais (1992). A History of the Druzes. Vol. 1. BRILL. ISBN 9004094377.
- Hütteroth, W.-D.; Abdulfattah, K. (1977). Historical Geography of Palestine, Transjordan and Southern Syria in the Late 16th Century. Erlanger Geographische Arbeiten, Sonderband 5. Erlangen, Germany: Vorstand der Fränkischen Geographischen Gesellschaft. ISBN 3-920405-41-2.
- Porter, J.L. (1855). Five years in Damascus: including an account of the history, topography, and antiquities of that city : with travels and researches in Palmyra, Lebanon, and the Hauran. Vol. 2. John Murray.
- Robinson, E.; Smith, E. (1841). Biblical Researches in Palestine, Mount Sinai and Arabia Petraea: A Journal of Travels in the year 1838. Vol. 3. Boston: Crocker & Brewster.
- Shahîd, I. (2002). Toponymy, Monuments, Historical Geography and Frontier Studies. Vol. 21. Dumbarton Oaks. ISBN 0884022846.
