= Kafr Ram =

Kafr Ram كفرام
- Town
- Kafram
- Location in Syria
- Coordinates: 34°51′57″N 36°22′28″E
- Country: Syria
- Governorate: Homs
- District: Homs
- Subdistrict: Taldou
- Elevation: 850–1,150 m (2,790–3,770 ft)

Population (2004)
  - Total: 2,115
- Time zone: UTC+3 (AST)

Kafr Ram (Arabic: كفرام, also spelled Kfar Ram or Kafram) is a town in western Syria administratively part of the Homs Governorate, and it is in Wadi Al Nasara ("Valley of the Christians"). It is located 50 kilometers northwest of Homs in the Taldou Subidistrict.

The name of the town is Aramaic in origin, with Kafr meaning "small Town" or "the spot", and Ram meaning "mountain". In the northern part of the village is the small, historic church of al-Qasr. The first primary school in the village was founded around 1935. Among Kafr Ram's water sources are several springs, the largest of which is known as 'Ayn al-Hamra.

== Geography ==
Kafr Ram is in Wadi Al Nasara in the west of Homs, situated along the northern foothills of the Dahr al-Qasir Mountain with an elevation ranging from 850 to 1,150 meters above sea level. Nearby localities include Barshin to the northwest, Khanazir and Bishanin to the north, Kafr Kamrah and Akakir to the northeast, Fahil and Rabah to the southeast, Bahhur to the south, Muqlus and Hasour to the southwest and al-Bitar, Ish al-Shuhah and Hadiyah to the west.

== Demographics ==
According to the Syria Central Bureau of Statistics (CBS), Kafr Ram had a population of 2,115 in the 2004 census. As of 2015, the population was estimated to be roughly 4,000. Kafr Ram's inhabitants are predominantly Greek Orthodox Christians, with Greek Catholic (Melkite) and Turkmen minorities.

== See also ==
- Fairouzeh
- Al-Hafar
- Maskanah
- Al-Qaryatayn
- Sadad
