= Christianity in Syria =

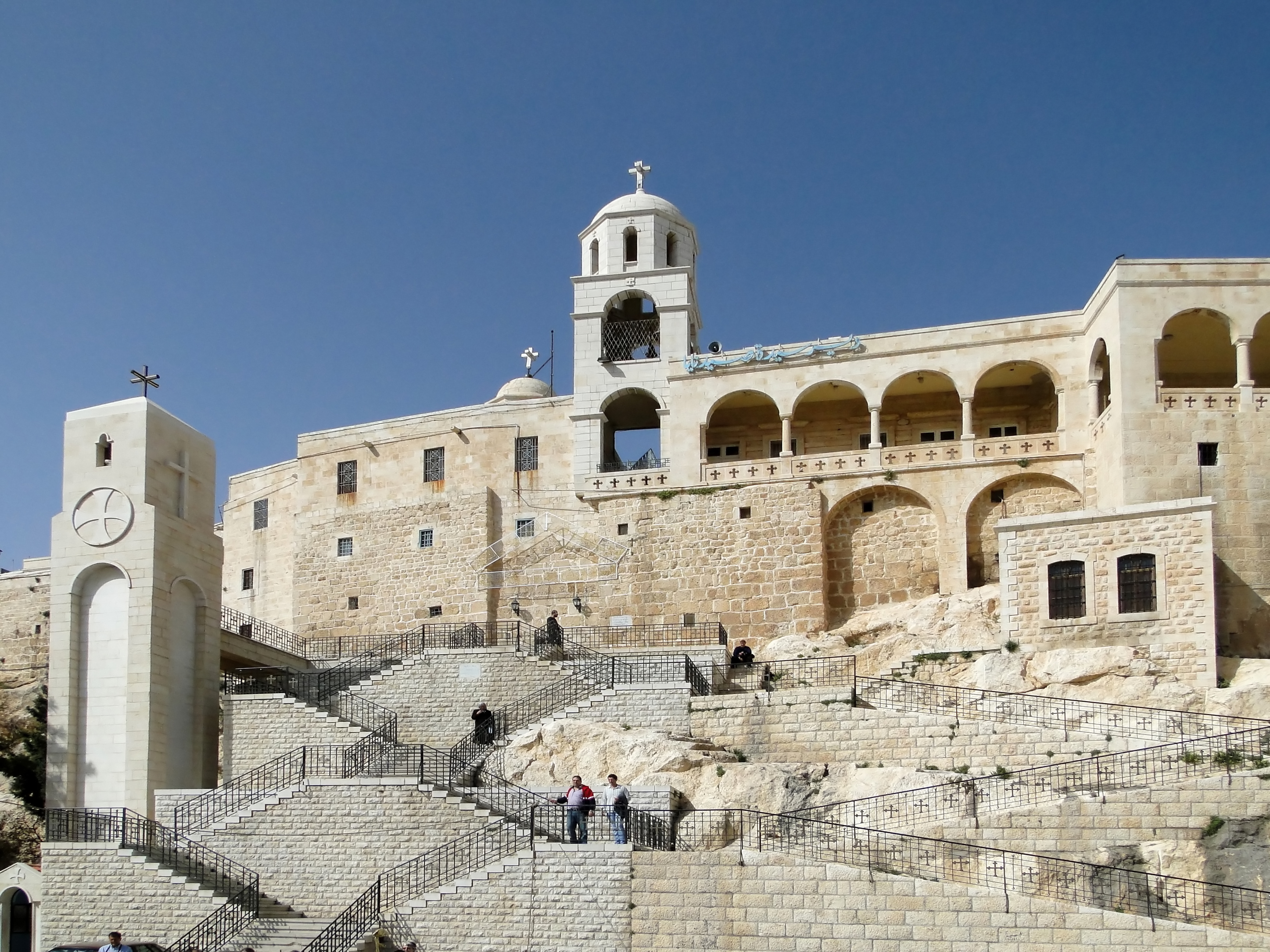
- Our Lady of Saidnaya Monastery, one of the oldest monasteries in the world

Total population
- 10% (2025 estimate)

Religions
- Greek Orthodox Church of Antioch, Melkite Greek Catholic Church, Syriac Orthodox Church, Syriac Catholic Church, Armenian Orthodox Church, Armenian Catholic Church, Maronite Church, Latin Church, Assyrian Church of the East and Protestantism

Languages
- Majority: Arabic; Minorities: Armenian, Aramaic (Syriac)

Syria has among the oldest Christian communities on Earth, dating back to the 1st century AD, and has been described as a "cradle of Christianity". With its roots in the traditions of Saint Peter and Paul the Apostle, Syria quickly became a major center of early Christianity and produced many significant theologians and church leaders. Of the 200 bishops who took part in the First Council of Nicaea in 325 AD, twenty were from Syria. Over the centuries, Syrian Christians have played a vital role in shaping Christian thought and practice, contributing to the development of various liturgical traditions, monastic movements, and theological schools. Paul the Apostle famously converted to Christianity on the road to Damascus, and Syria has produced seven Popes: Pope Anicetus (157–168 AD), Pope John V (685–686), Pope Sergius I (687–701), Pope Sisinnius (708), Pope Constantine (708–715), Pope Gregory III (731–741 AD), and the first pope, Saint Peter, who was from Bethsaida. Their legacy includes the establishment of some of the most ancient churches, monasteries, and pilgrimage sites, such as the 5th century remains of the Church of Saint Simeon Stylites, Our Lady of Saidnaya Monastery, and the Cathedral of Constantine and Helen.

However, in recent times, the Syrian Christian community has faced numerous challenges, including ongoing and severe persecution, displacement, and emigration. Christians in Syria made up about 10% of the pre-war Syrian population but now it is estimated that they make up much lower due to the impact of the Syrian Civil War. Christians in Syria have also been subjected to violence and discrimination by Islamic State fighters during their control of large areas of the country. Their churches have been converted into military headquarters, and their property confiscated. Persecution of Christians in Syria has further intensified since. In Aleppo, the country's second largest city, the proportion of Christian residents fell from 12% pre-war to 1.4% in 2023 with more than 20 churches damaged during the war. The city of Idlib has been almost entirely depopulated of its Christian population under Islamist rule. Some governments and organisations including the United States have claimed that the persecution of Christians in the Middle East and North Africa, especially in Syria and Iraq, constitute an act of genocide.

The country's largest Christian denomination is the Greek Orthodox Church of Antioch, closely followed by the Syriac Orthodox Church and the Armenian Apostolic Church. There is a small minority of Protestants in the country.

== Overview ==
In the late Ottoman rule, a large percentage of Syrian Christians emigrated from Syria, especially after the bloody chain of events that targeted Christians in particular in 1840, the 1860 massacre, and the Assyrian genocide. According to historian Philip Hitti, approximately 90,000 Syrians arrived in the United States between 1899 and 1919 (more than 90% of them Christians). The Syrians referred to includes historical Syria, or the Levant, encompassing Syria, Lebanon, Jordan and Palestine. Syrian Christians tend to be relatively wealthy and highly educated.

According to the Catholic charity group Aid to the Church (ACN), the number of Christians residing in Syria is estimated to have fallen from 2.1 million (10% of population) in 2011 to around 300,000 (less than 2%) in 2022. The decrease is due to a large-scale emigration of Christians to Europe triggered by deteriorating living conditions caused by the civil war. US State Department estimates that Syrian Christians comprise 2.5-3% of the total population inside Syria, as of 2022.

== Origins ==
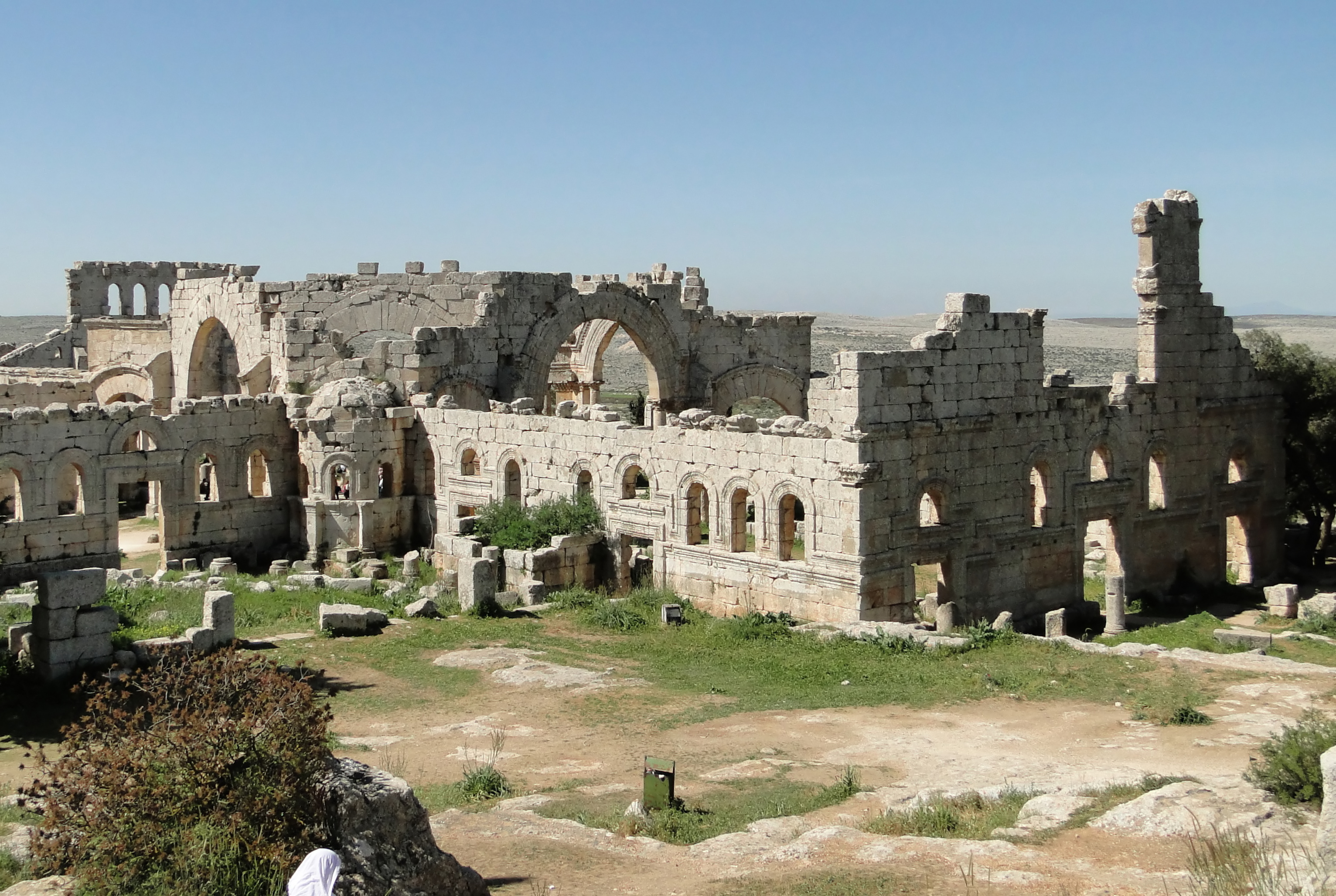
Church of Saint Simeon Stylites in Aleppo, Syria, is considered to be one of the oldest surviving ruins of a church building in the world.

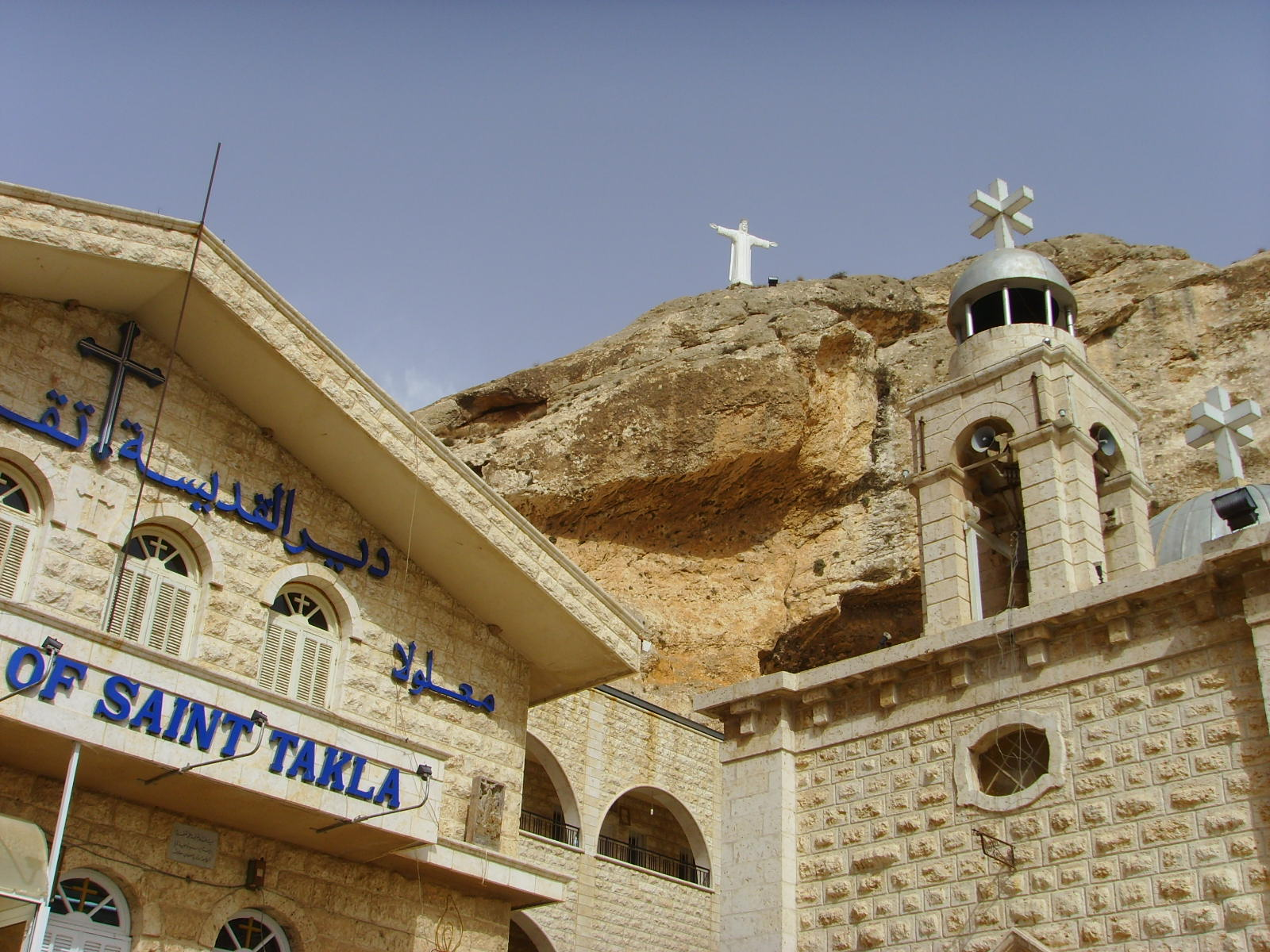
Convent of Saint Thecla in Maaloula, Rif Dimashq

The Christian population of Syria comprised 10% of the Syrian population before 2011. Estimates of the number of Christians in Syria in 2022 range from less than 2% to around 2.5% of the total Syrian population.

Most Syrians are members of either the Greek Orthodox Church of Antioch (700,000), or the Syriac Orthodox Church. The vast majority of Catholics belong to the Melkite Greek Catholic Church. Other Eastern Catholic churches include the Maronite Church, Syriac Catholic Church, Armenian Catholic Church, Chaldean Catholic Church; there is also a small number of Latin Church Catholics. The rest belong to the Eastern communions, which have existed in Syria since the earliest days of Christianity when all Christians were part of the Early Christianity. The main Eastern groups are:

- the autocephalous Eastern Orthodox churches;
- the autocephalous Oriental Orthodox Churches;
- the Eastern Catholic Churches, which are in communion with Rome;
- and the independent Assyrian Church of the East (i.e., the "Nestorian" Church). Followers of the Assyrian Church of the East are almost all Sureth speaking ethnic Assyrians whose origins lie in Mesopotamia, as are some Oriental Orthodox and Eastern Catholic Christians.

Even though each group forms a separate community, Christians nevertheless cooperate increasingly. Roman Rite, Western Latin Church Catholicism and Protestantism were introduced by missionaries but only a small number of Syrians are members of Western rites.

The schisms that brought about the many sects resulted from both political and doctrinal disagreements. The doctrine most commonly at issue was the nature of Christ. In 431, the Nestorians were separated from the main body of the Church because of their belief in the dual character of Christ, i.e., that he had two distinct but inseparable "qnoma" (ܩܢܘܡܐ, close in meaning to, but not exactly the same as, hypostasis), the human Jesus and the divine Logos. Therefore, according to Nestorian belief, Mary was not the mother of God but only of the man Jesus. The Council of Chalcedon, representing the mainstream of Christianity, in 451 confirmed the dual nature of Christ in one person; Mary was therefore the mother of a single person, mystically and simultaneously both human and divine. The Miaphysites taught that the Logos took on an instance of humanity as His own in one nature. They were the precursors of the present-day Syriac and Armenian Orthodox churches.

By the thirteenth century, breaks had developed between Eastern or Greek Christianity and Western or Latin Christianity. In the following centuries, however, especially during the Ottoman era, some of the Eastern churches professed the authority of the pope in Rome and entered into or re-affirmed communion with the Catholic Church. Today called as the Eastern Catholic churches, they retain a distinctive language, canon law and liturgy.

=== Eastern Orthodoxy ===
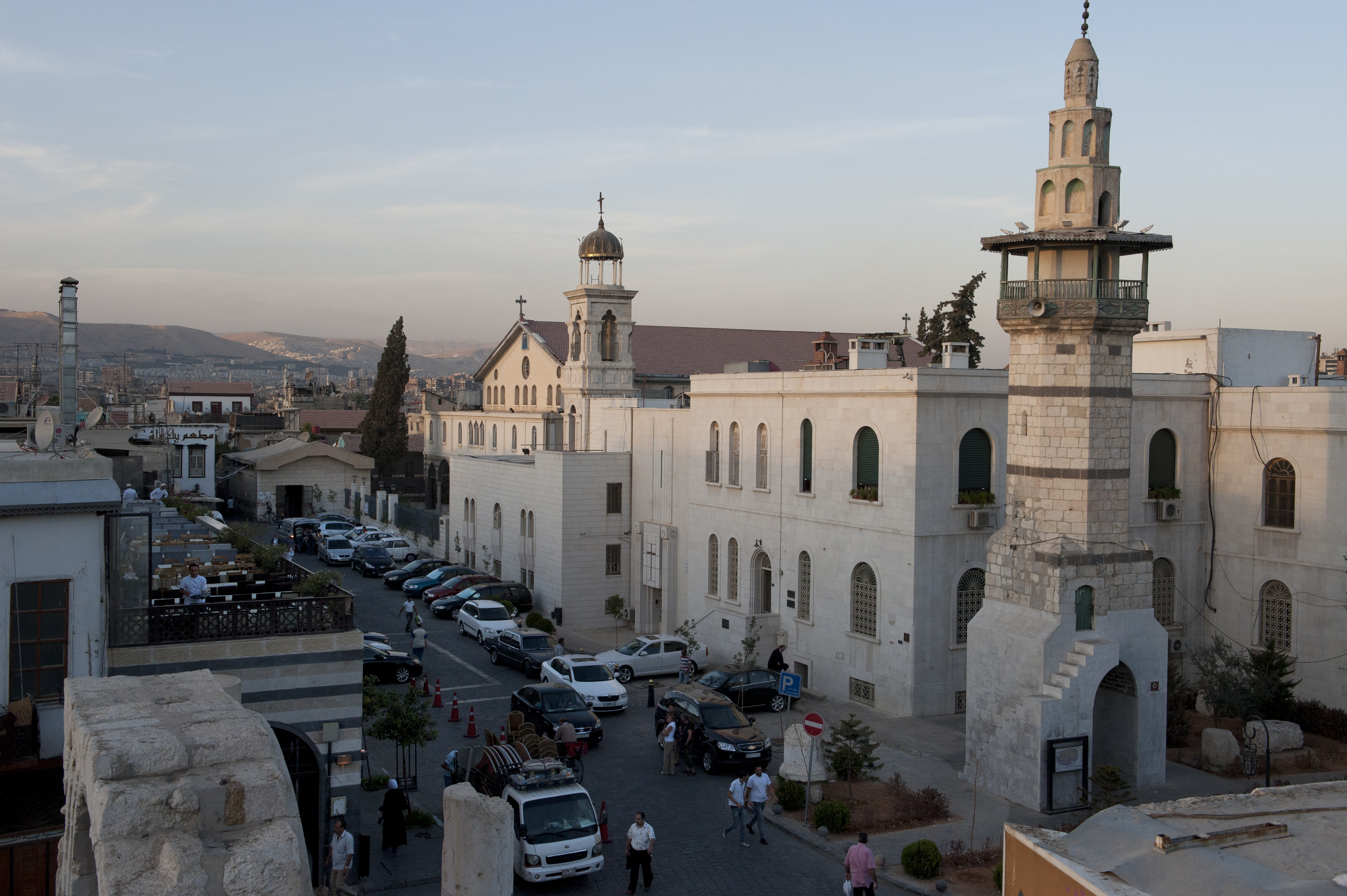
Mariamite Cathedral of Damascus

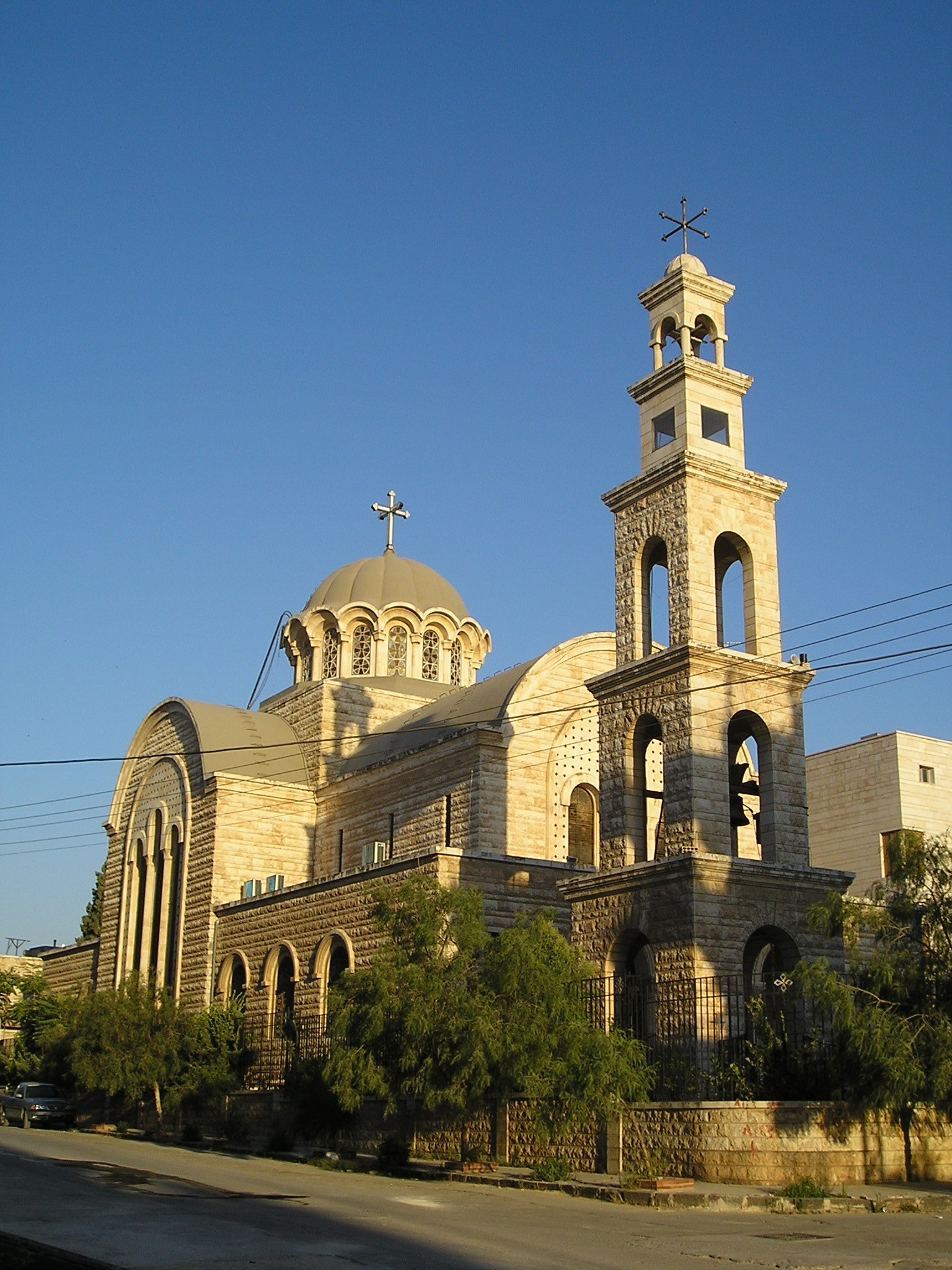
St. George's Cathedral in Hama

The largest Christian denomination in Syria is the Greek Orthodox Church of Antioch (officially named the Orthodox Patriarchate of Antioch and All the East), also known as the Melkite church after the 5th and 6th century Christian schisms, in which its clergy remained loyal to the Eastern Roman Emperor ("melek") of Constantinople.

Adherents of that denomination generally call themselves "Rūm" which means "Eastern Romans" or "Asian Greeks" in Arabic. In that particular context, the term "Rūm" is used in preference to "Yūnāniyyūn" which means "European Greeks" or Ionians in Classical Arabic. The appellation "Greek" refers to the Koine Greek liturgy used in their traditional prayers and priestly rites.

Members of the community sometimes also call themselves "Melkites", which literally means "supporters of the emperor" in Semitic languages – a reference to their past allegiance to Roman and Byzantine imperial rule. But, in the modern era, this designation tends to be more commonly used by followers of the local Melkite Catholic Church.

Syrians from the Greek Orthodox Community are also present in the Hatay Province of Southern Turkey (bordering Northern Syria), and have been well represented within the Syrian diasporas of Brazil, Argentina, Mexico, the United States, Canada and Australia.

=== Oriental Orthodoxy ===
Traditional Christianity in Syria is also represented by Oriental Orthodox communities, that primarily belong to the ancient Syriac Orthodox Church, and also to the Armenian Apostolic Church.

==== Syriac Orthodox Church ====
The Syriac Orthodox Church is the largest Oriental Orthodox Christian group in Syria. The Syriac Orthodox or Jacobite Church, whose liturgy is in Syriac, was severed from the favored church of the Byzantine Empire (Eastern Orthodoxy), over the Chalcedonian controversy.

==== Armenian Apostolic Church ====
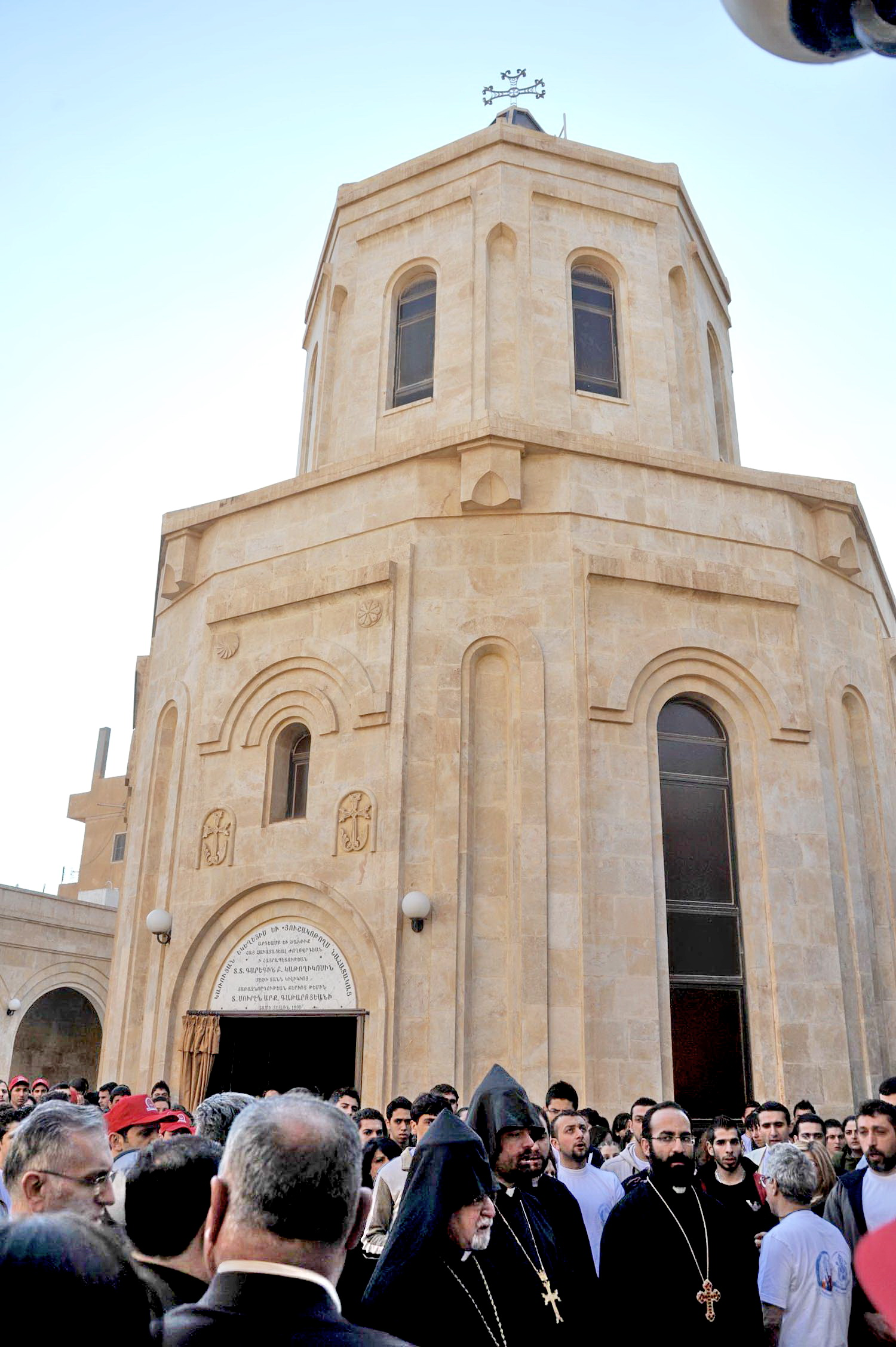
Armenian Genocide Martyrs Memorial Church in Deir ez-Zor

The Armenian Apostolic Church is the second largest Oriental Orthodox Christian group in Syria. It uses an Armenian liturgy and its doctrine is Miaphysite (not monophysite, which is a mistaken term used or was used by the Chalcedonian Catholics and Chalcedonian Orthodox).

=== Catholic Church ===
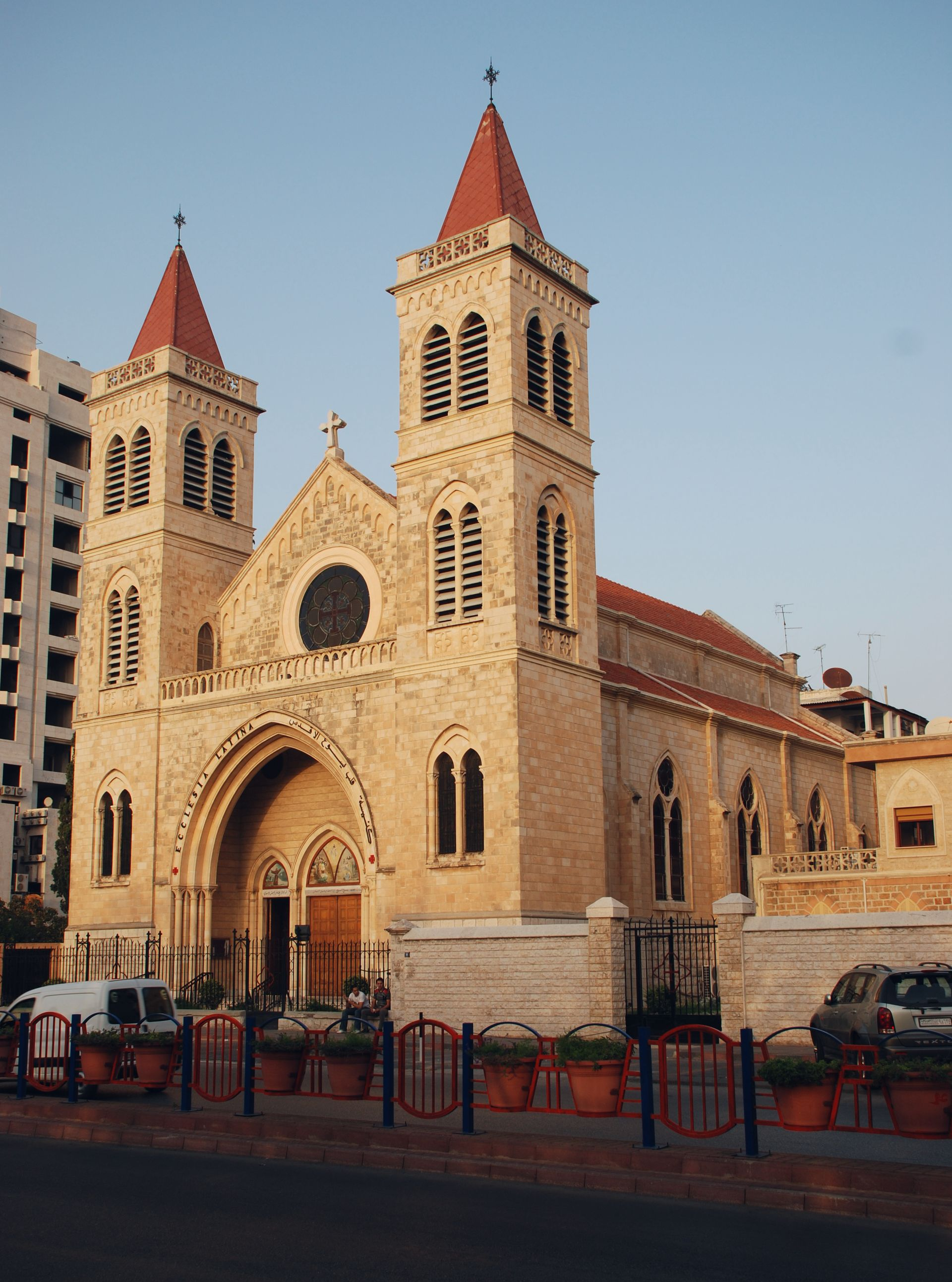
Latin Church in Latakia

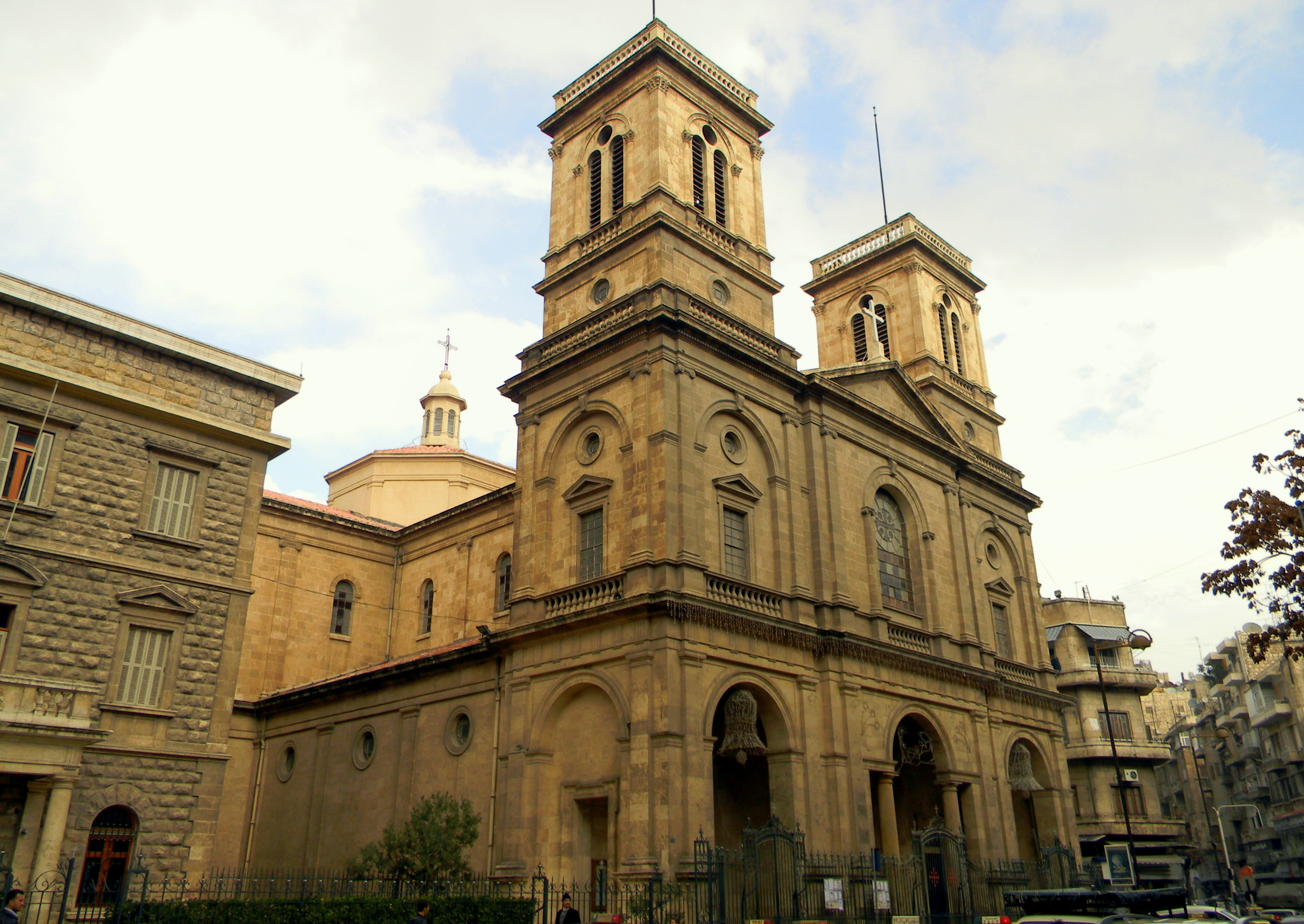
Saint Francis of Assisi Church in Aleppo

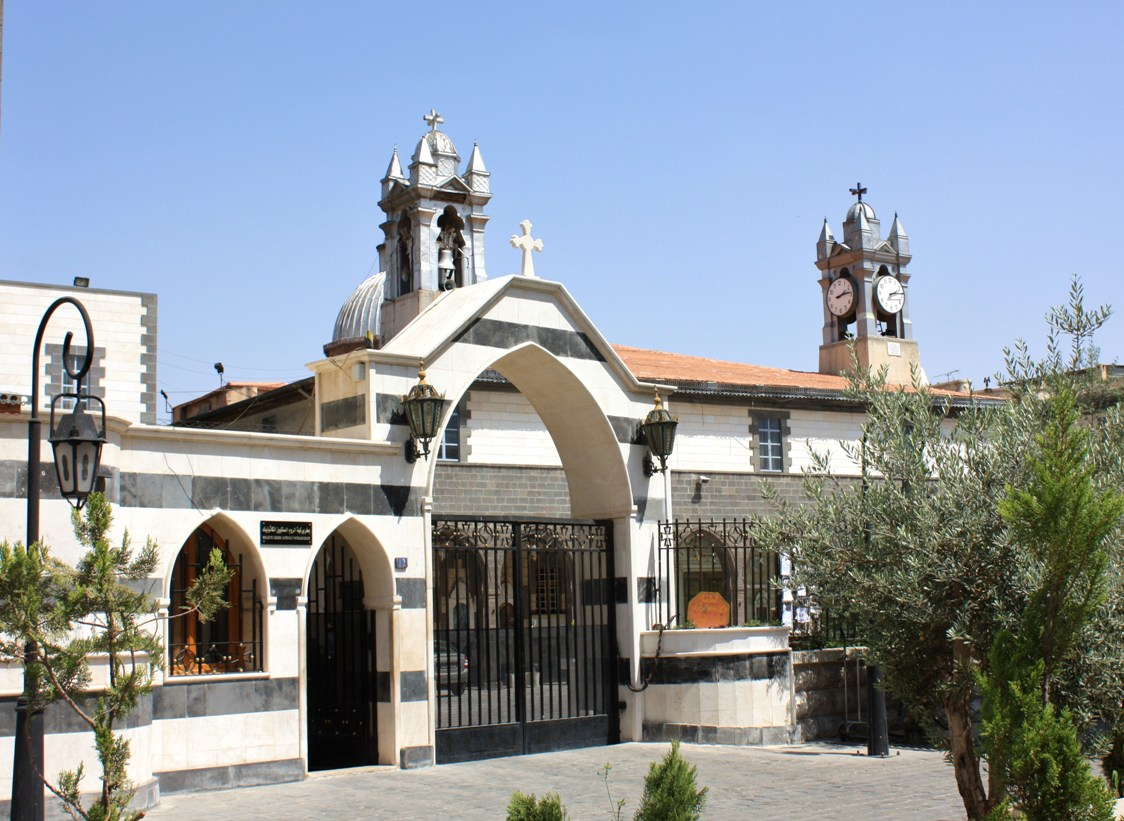
Cathedral of Our Lady of the Dormition in Damascus

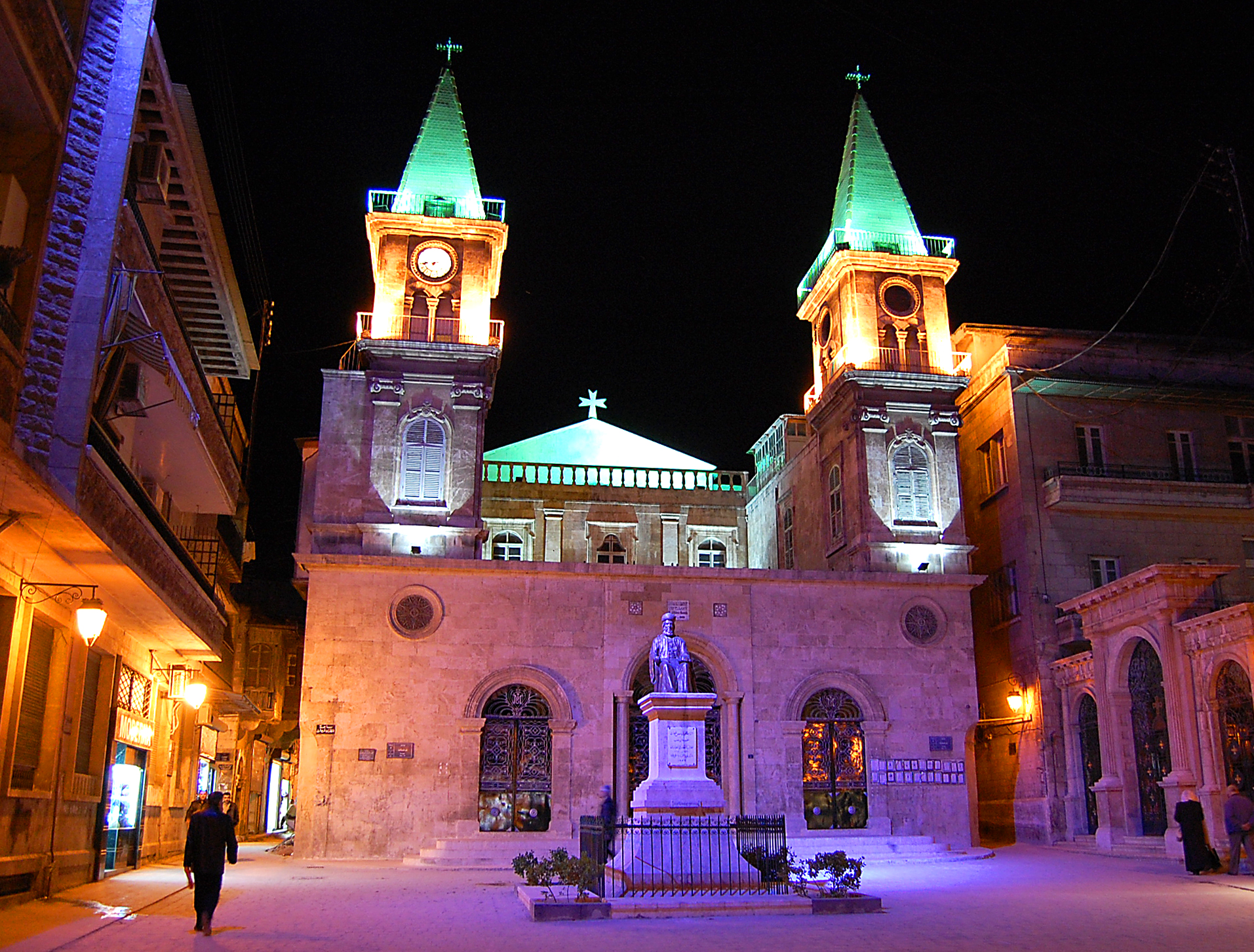
Saint Elijah Cathedral in Aleppo

Of the Eastern Catholic Churches, the oldest is the Maronite, with ties to Rome dating at least from the twelfth century. Their status before then is unclear, some claiming it originally held to the Monothelite heresy up until 1215, while the Maronite Church claims it has always been in union with Rome. The liturgy is celebrated in Aramaic (Syriac).

The Patriarchate of Antioch never recognized the mutual excommunications of Rome and Constantinople of 1054, so it was canonically still in union with both. After a disputed patriarchal election in 1724, it divided into two groups, one in union with Rome and the other with Constantinople. The term "Melkite" is in use mostly in reference to the Melkite Greek Catholic Church. Like its sister-church, the Greek Orthodox Church of Antioch ('Eastern Orthodox'), the Melkite Catholic Church uses both Greek and Arabic in its form of the liturgy. Most of the 375,000 Catholics in Syria belong to the Melkite Greek Catholic Church, the rest are members of the Latin Church, Maronites (52,000), Armenian or Syriac Rites.

==== Popes of the Catholic Church ====
Seven popes from Syria ascended the papal throne. Many of them lived in Italy. Pope Gregory III was the last pope born outside Europe until Francis was elected in 2013.

Numerical order	Pontificate	Portrait	Name English · Regnal	Personal name	Place of birth	Notes
1	33 – 64/67		St Peter; PETRUS	Simon Peter	Bethsaida, Galilea, Roman Empire	Saint Peter was from village of Bethsaida, Gaulanitis, Syria, Roman Empire
11	155 to 166		St Anicetus; ANICETUS	Anicitus	Emesa, Syria	Traditionally martyred; feast day 17 April
82	12 July 685 – 2 August 686 (1 year+)		John V Papa IOANNES Quintus		Antioch, Syria	
84	15 December 687 – 8 September 701 (3 year+)		St Sergius I Papa Sergius		Sicily, Italy	Sergius I was born in Sicily, but he was from Syrian parentage
87	15 January 708 to 4 February 708 (21 days)		Sisinnius; Papa SISINNIUS		Syria	
88	25 March 708 – 9 April 715 (7 years+)		Constantine; Papa COSTANTINUS sive CONSTANTINUS		Syria	Last pope to visit Greece while in office, until John Paul II in 2001
90	18 March 731 to 28 November 741 (10 years+)		St Gregory III; Papa GREGORIUS Tertius		Syria	Third pope to bear the same name as his immediate predecessor.

=== Protestant Churches ===
In Syria, there is also a minority of Protestants. Protestantism was introduced by European missionaries and a small number of Syrians are members of Protestant denominations. The Gustav-Adolf-Werk (GAW) as the Protestant Church in Germany Diaspora agency actively supports persecuted Protestant Christians in Syria with aid projects. A 2015 study estimates some 2,000 Muslim converted to Christianity in Syria, most of them belonging to some form of Protestantism.

By one estimate made by Elisabe Granli from University of Oslo, around 1,920 Syrian Druze converted to Christianity, according to the same study Christian of Druze background (Druze converts to Christianity) still regard themselves as Druze, and they claim that there is no contradiction between being Druze and being Christian.

== Demographics ==
The number of Christians in Syria has been disputed for many decades. There has been no official census on religion in Syria since the 1960s.

Christianity in Syria 1956
1. Eastern Orthodoxy (mainly Antiochian Greeks) (35.7%)
2. Oriental Orthodoxy (mostly Armenians and Syriacs) (33.3%)
3. Catholic Church (both Easterns and Latins) (26.2%)
4. Protestantism (2.46%)
5. Church of the East (2.31%)

Christianity in Syria
		1943	% of population	1944	1945	1948	1953	% of population	1956
Greek Orthodox		136 957	4,79	139 265		149 706	168 747	4,62	181 750
Greek Catholics		46 733	1,63	47 522		50 423	55 880	1,53	60 124
Armenians	Orthodox	101 747	3,56	103 180		106 298	110 594	3,03	114 041
Armenians	Catholics	16 790	0,59	17 072		17 706	19 492	0,53	20 637
Total Armenians		118 537	4,15	120 252	121 310	124 004	130 086	3,56	134 678
Assyrians	Syriac Orthodox	40 135	1,40	40 994		43 652	51 363	1,40	55 343
Assyrians	Syriac Catholics	16 247	0,57	16 562		17 830	19 738	0,54	20 716
Assyrians	ACOE	9 176	0,32	9 215		9 690	11 176	0,31	11 760
Assyrians	Chaldeans	4 719	0,16	4 765		5 022	5 492	0,15	5 723
Total Assyrians		70 277	2,45	71 536		76 194	87 769	2,40	93 542
Maronites		13 349	0,47	13 621		14 797	16 530	0,45	19 291
Latin Catholics		5 996	0,21	6 083		6 323	6 749	0,18	7 079
Protestants		11 187	0,39	11 379		12 433	13 209	0,36	12 535
Total Christians		403 036	14,09	409 658	414 911	433 880	478 970	13,10	508 999
Total		2 860 411	100,00	2 901 316	2 949 919	3 092 703	3 655 904	100,00	

== Status of Christians in Syria ==
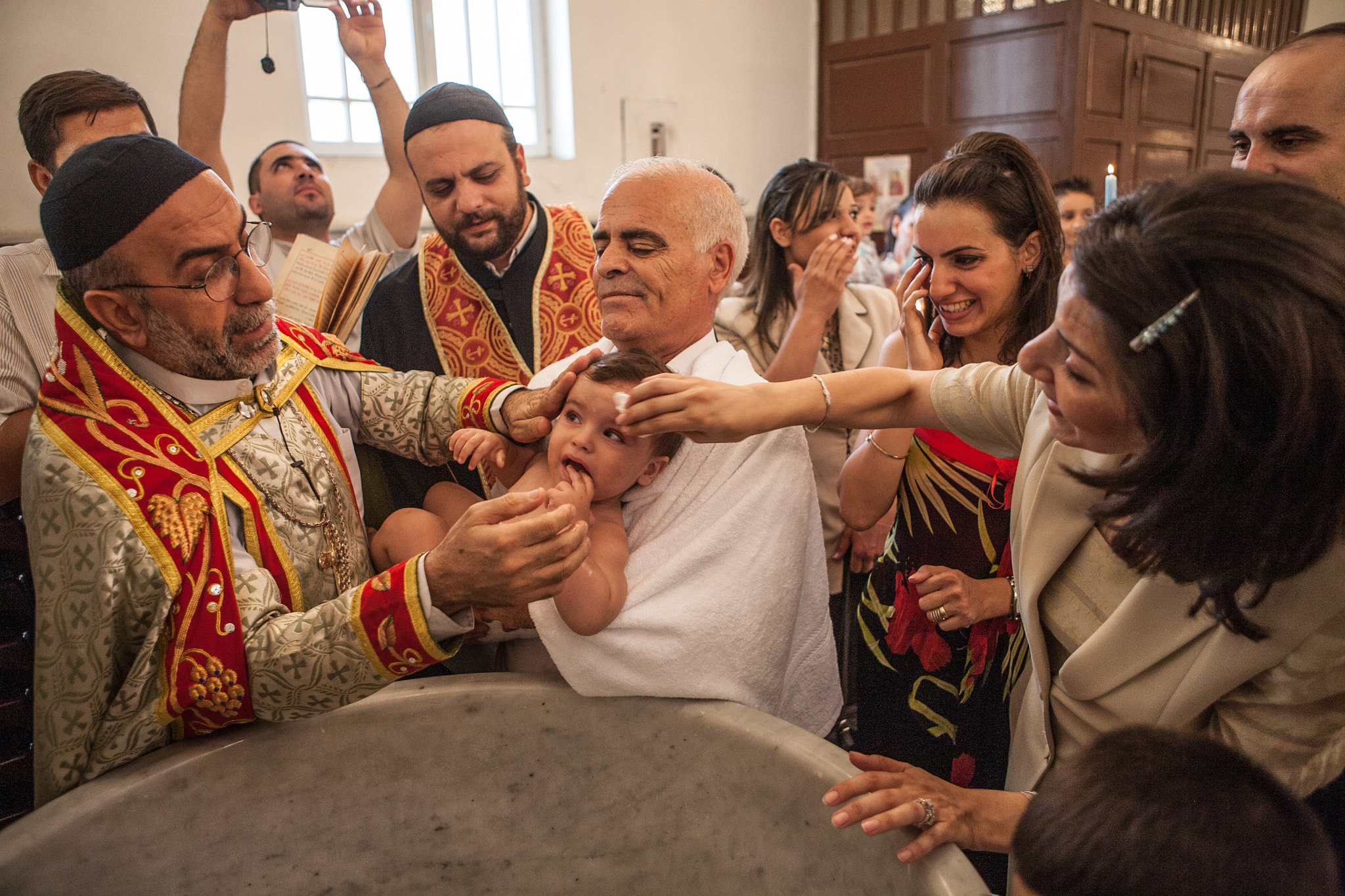
Assyrian Christian baptism in Syria

Damascus was one of the first regions to receive Christianity during the ministry of St Peter. There were more Christians in Damascus than anywhere else. With the military expansion of the Islamic Umayyad empire into Syria and Anatolia, non-Muslims who retained their native faiths were required to pay a tax (jizya) equivalent to the Islamic Zakat, and were permitted to own land; they were, however, not eligible for Islamic social welfare as Muslims were.

Damascus still contains a sizeable proportion of Christians, with some churches all over the city, but particularly in the district of Bab Touma (The Gate of Thomas in Aramaic and Arabic). Masses are held every Sunday and civil servants are given Sunday mornings off to allow them to attend church, even though Sunday is a working day in Syria. Schools in Christian-dominated districts have Saturday and Sunday as the weekend, while the official Syrian weekend falls on Friday and Saturday.

=== Integration ===
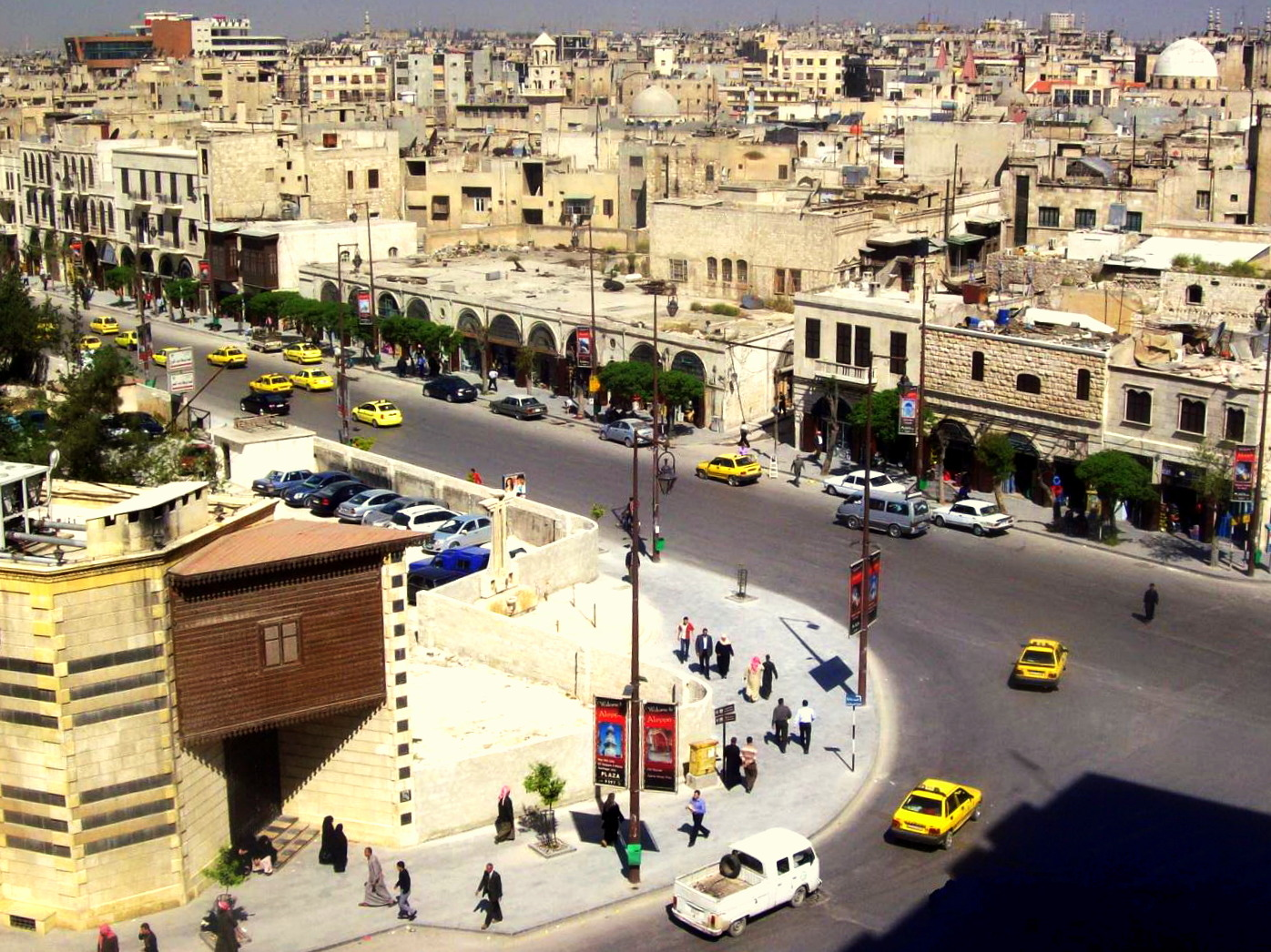
The old Christian quarter of Jdeydeh, Aleppo

Christians engage in every aspect of Syrian life and Syrian Christians are relatively wealthy and more highly educated than other Syrian religious groups. Following in the traditions of Paul, who practiced his preaching and ministry in the marketplace, Syrian Christians are participants in the economy, the academic, scientific, engineering, arts, and intellectual life, entertainment, and the Politics of Syria. Many Syrian Christians are public sector and private sector managers and directors, while some are local administrators, members of Parliament, and ministers in the government. A number of Syrian Christians are also officers in the armed forces of Syria. They have preferred to mix in with Muslims rather than form all-Christian units and brigades, and fought alongside their Muslim compatriots against Israeli forces in the various Arab–Israeli conflicts of the 20th century. In addition to their daily work, Syrian Christians also participate in volunteer activities in the less developed areas of Syria. As a result, Syrian Christians are generally viewed by other Syrians as an asset to the larger community. In September 2017, the deputy Hammouda Sabbagh, a Syriac Orthodox Christian and member of the Ba'ath Party, was elected speaker of parliament with 193 votes out of 252.

=== Separation ===
Syrian Christians are more urbanized than Muslims; many live either in or around Damascus, Aleppo, Homs, Hama, or Latakia. In the 18th century, Christians were relatively wealthier than Muslims in Aleppo. Syrian Christians have their own courts that deal with civil cases like marriage, divorce and inheritance based on Bible teachings.

The Constitution of Syria states that the President of Syria has to be a Muslim; this was as a result of popular demand at the time the constitution was written. However, until recently Syria did not profess a state religion.

On 31 January 1973, Hafez al-Assad implemented the new constitution (after reaching power through a military coup in 1970), which led to a national crisis. Unlike previous constitutions, this one did not require that the president of Syria to be of the Islamic faith, leading to fierce demonstrations in Hama, Homs and Aleppo organized by the Muslim Brotherhood and the ulama. They labeled Assad as the "enemy of Allah" and called for a jihad against his rule. Robert D. Kaplan has compared Assad's coming to power to "a Jew becoming tsar in Russia – an unprecedented development shocking to the Sunni majority population which had monopolized power for so many centuries."

The government survived a series of armed revolts by Islamists, mainly members of the Muslim Brotherhood, from 1976 until 1982.

=== Freedom of religion in the 2020s ===
In 2023, the country was scored 2 out of 4 for religious freedom, with the government controlling the appointment of Muslim religious leaders, restricted proselytizing, a ban on conversion of Muslims and active terror threats.

In the same year, the country was ranked as the 12th most difficult place in the world to be a Christian.

In 2025, during a conference in Rome, organised by pontifical charity Aid to the Church in Need, Archbishop Jacques Maurad, of Homs, described the current status of Christians in Syria, saying: "The Syrian people continue to suffer violence, reprisals, and tragic and regrettable events that undermine all the international claims and popular demands to put an end to this bloodbath. We are become more and more like Afghanistan. We don’t have that level of violence yet, but we’re not that far off either. People are under all sorts of pressure. Don’t think we are heading towards greater freedom, religious or otherwise”.

== Christian Communities ==
Christians spread throughout Syria and have sizable populations in some cities/areas; important cities/areas are:

- Aleppo – has the largest Christian population of various denominations (mostly ethnic Armenians and Assyrians. Also members of Greek Orthodox Church of Antioch and Melkite Greek Catholic Church)
- Damascus – contains sizable Christian communities of all Christian denominations represented in the country
- Homs – has the second largest Christian population (mostly members of Greek Orthodox Church of Antioch)
- Wadi al-Nasara or Valley of Christians – has a sizable Christian population in the area (mostly members of Greek Orthodox Church of Antioch)
- Safita – has a sizable Christian population (mostly members of Greek Orthodox Church of Antioch)
- Maaloula – has a sizable Christian population (mostly members of Greek Orthodox Church of Antioch and Melkite Catholic Church)
- Saidnaya – has a sizable Christian population (mostly members of Greek Orthodox Church of Antioch)
- Tartous – has a sizable Christian population (mostly members of Greek Orthodox Church of Antioch)
- Latakia – has a sizable Christian population (mostly members of Greek Orthodox Church of Antioch)
- Suwayda – has a sizable Christian population (mostly members of Greek Orthodox Church of Antioch and Melkite Greek Catholic Church)
- Al-Hasakah – has a large ethnic Assyrian population (mostly members of Syriac Orthodox Church)
- Qamishli – has a large ethnic Assyrian population (mostly members of Syriac Orthodox Church)
- Khabur River – 35 villages has a large ethnic Assyrian population (mostly members of the Assyrian Church of the East)
- Hama Governorate – has a number of Christian towns/cities/villages (Maharda, Al-Suqaylabiyah, Kafr Buhum, Toumin, Ayyo, Al-Biyah, Ain Halaqim, Barshin, Al-Bayda, Hazzour). Christians also live in the city of Hama
- Idlib Governorate – has five Christian villages between the Orontes river and the Turkish frontier (Al-Quniyah, Al-Yacoubiyah, Judayda, Hallouz and Al-Ghassaniyah). Christians also live in the cities of Idlib and Jisser al-Shughour.
- Daraa Governorate – several Christian towns and villages at the western side of the Lajat: Izra, Khabab, Bassir, Tubna, Al-Masmiyah and Shaqra, in addition to Ghasm and Rakhm in the southeastern part of the Governorate

== Syrian Christians during the Syrian civil war ==
2012 VOA report about fears of Syrian Christians during the civil war

Syrian Christians, in line with their fellow citizens, have been badly affected by the Syrian civil war. According to Syrian law, all Syrian men of adult age with brothers are eligible for military conscription, including Christians.

Christian population in Syria has significantly diminished due to the departure of many Christians from the country amidst the civil war. In the first five years after the outbreak of the Syrian Civil War in 2011, at least half of Syria's Christians had left the country, but as the situation began to stabilize in 2017 following recent army gains, return of electricity and water to many areas and stability returning to many government controlled regions, some Christians began returning to Syria, most notably in the city of Homs. Assyrian Democratic Organization (ADO), an Assyrian opposition group affiliated with the Syrian National Revolutionary Coalition (SNRC), estimated that approximately two-thirds of Syrian Christians had left the country by 2021. The estimate was also verified by other Christian organizations in Syria.

During the civil war, several attacks by ISIS have targeted Syrian Christians, including the 2015 al-Qamishli bombings and the July 2016 Qamishli bombings. In January 2016, YPG militias conducted a surprise attack on Assyrian checkpoints in Qamishli, in a predominantly Assyrian area, killing one Assyrian and wounding three others. More than 120 churches and Christian places of worship have been destroyed since the Syrian civil war began in 2011. In November 2021, the Armenian Catholic Church of the Martyrs in Raqqa's city center was rebuilt by the aid group called the Free Burma Rangers.

Following a visit to Syria, to participate in a conference that brought together representatives of the Syrian churches and NGOs working with them in the country, Regina Lynch, project director for Aid to the Church in Need, described the difficult situation the local communities endure, but added that "for many Christians, the war has had a positive effect on the faith, and, in spite of everything, it has been an opportunity for the Church to put its teaching on charity and forgiveness into action".

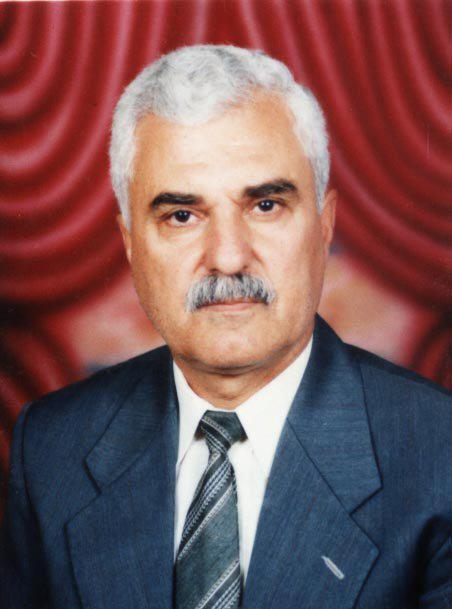
Syrian Christian politician George Sabra, former head of Syrian Interim Government and former President of Istanbul-based Syrian National Council

Prominent Christian figures have been involved in revolutionary activities of the Syrian opposition; through peaceful demonstrations as well as armed resistance. After the deadly clampdown launched by Assad regime deteriorated into a civil war, many Christians volunteered in various humanitarian organizations like the Syrian Civil Defence. As of 2019, according to the Syrian Network for Human Rights, around 61% of churches damaged in the Syrian civil war has been targeted by pro-Ba'athist forces. Also according to the SNHR, out of 124 documented incidents of violence against Christian religious centres between 2011 and 2019; 75 attacks were perpetrated by militant forces loyal to the Assad regime and 33 by various factions of the opposition.

The US Separtment of State and “various humans rights organizations” have criticized the regime for deliberately launching large-scale attacks on Christian churches and arresting Christian citizens. In April 2013, Gregorios Ibrahim, the Archbishop of Syrian Orthodox Church in Aleppo, lamenting the vast exodus of a third of Syria's Christians from Syria, as well as indiscriminate attacks on Syrian cities and civilian areas since the civil war began. A week after issuing the statement, the Archbishop was abducted and has remained missing ever since; allegedly by Al-Nusra Front before being handed over to ISIS. Ba'athist regime has also passed a discriminatory military conscription law which enables government authorities to seize properties of Syrians and their families accused of draft evasion. The law disproportionately targets Sunni and Christian families across Syria, who constitute the vast majority of the Syrian refugee population.

According to various reports, the total population of Syrian Christians residing in Syria has been reduced from 1.5 million before 2011 to around 300,000 as of 2022 (less than 2% of population). Rather than the persecution by IS during 2014–17, the decline has been mainly due to large-scale emigration of native Christians due to subsequent deterioration of living conditions in the war-torn country. Many rural and young Christians view emigration to Europe as a way to advance career opportunities in education and employment, in addition to providing better prospects for their families.

=== After the fall of the Assad regime ===
Following the fall of the Assad regime in December 2024, the Syrian Transitional Government, despite being composed of Islamists, vowed to respect the Christians and other religious denominations in Syria. However, in the weeks following HTS taking power, numerous reports emerged of Christians, among other minorities, being persecuted in Syria. An unknown number of non-Alawite religious minorities, including Christians, were also targeted and killed in massacres of Syrian Alawites during clashes in western Syria in March 2025, with many fleeing their villages to the mountains.

On 22 June 2025, at least one attacker opened fire and detonated an explosive device inside the Greek Orthodox Mar Elias Church during Divine Liturgy in Damascus, Syria, killing at least 30 people and injuring 54 others. The Syrian Ministry of Interior said the Islamic State was responsible for the suicide attack, while Saraya Ansar al-Sunnah claimed responsibility.

During the southern Syria clashes in July 2025, the churches in the villages of As-Sawra al-Kabira, Rudaymat al-Liwa, Taara and Ad-Duwayra in Suwayda Governorate were robbed, vandalized, and burned by members of the Defence and Interior Ministries, along with armed Bedouin men. According to international Catholic charity Aid to the Church in Need, 38 houses belonging to Christian families were set on fire and a bomb attack was prevented at a Maronite church in Tartus.

Christian neighbourhoods were caught in the crossfire in Aleppo during the standoff between regime forces and the Kurdish-led SDF, though not specifically targeted for religious reasons. Catholic charity Aid to the Church in Need estimated that around 25 houses were completely destroyed and around 350 suffered damage. There was also an unspecified number of dead and wounded.

In an interview with ACN, in August 2026, Syrian Franciscan Fadi Azar described some of the pressure affecting the Christian communities in Syria. He mentioned "overall poverty, due to the terrible economic situation and inflation, has led to a rise in criminality. Many people lost their jobs, because the current government dismissed all the civil servants and members of the military who served under Assad. Therefore, many young people, including parents, are unemployed. Insecurity has increased a lot, and we have seen a rise in kidnappings and looting by criminal groups" adding that there were also cases of "vandalization of Christian cemeteries and graffities against Christians spray painted on the walls of several churches. We are also seeing several cases of radical Muslim groups sending cars with loudspeakers to different areas, calling on Christians to convert to Islam".

In March and October 2026 Christians and their properties were attacked in Al-Suqaylabiyah by Muslim neighbours from the village of Al-Qalaa. Christian leaders called on government forces to protect them from violence.

== Notable Christians ==
- Fares al-Khoury, Prime Minister of Syria (1944–1945) and (1954–1955)
- Mikhail Ilyan, Minister of Foreign Affairs (1945)
- Michel Aflaq, philosopher and politician
- Sami al-Jundi, politician
- Mikhail Wehbe, Permanent Representative of Syria to the United Nations (1996–2003)
- Ibrahim Haddad, Minister of Oil and Mineral Reserves (2001–2006)
- Dawoud Rajiha, Minister of Defence (2011–2012)
- Hammouda Sabbagh, Speaker of the People's Council of Syria (2017–2024)
- George Sabra, politician
- Hind Kabawat, politician
- Philip Stamma, chess player
- Mary Ajami, poet and pioneering feminist writer
- Yohanna Ibrahim, Syriac Orthodox Archbishop and kidnapping victim
- Paul (Yazigi) of Aleppo, Greek Orthodox Archbishop and kidnapping victim
- Paul of Aleppo, chronicler
- Bassem Yakhour, actor
- Kosai Khauli, actor
- Dima Kandalaft, actor
- George Wassouf, singer
- Nassif Zeytoun, singer
- George Tutunjian, singer
- Lena Chamamyan, singer
- Faia Younan, singer
- Paul Anka, American-Syrian singer
- Nouri Iskandar, composer
- Zeina Yazigi, journalist
- Ghada Shouaa, heptathlete

== See also ==
- Arab Christians
- Anglican Diocese of Jerusalem
- Christianity and Islam
- National Evangelical Synod of Syria and Lebanon
- Christianity in the Middle East
- Religion in the Middle East
- Genocide of Christians by the Islamic State
- Sectarianism and minorities in the Syrian Civil War
- 1860 civil conflict in Mount Lebanon and Damascus
- Massacre of Aleppo (1850)
- Great Famine of Mount Lebanon (1915–1918)
- Late Ottoman genocides
- Religion in Syria
- Freedom of religion in Syria
- Catholic Church in Syria
- Eastern Orthodoxy in Syria
- List of monasteries in Syria
- List of churches in Aleppo
- St Baradates
- The Ascetical Homilies of Isaac the Syrian
