= Akakir =

Akakir عكاكير Akakeer
- Village
- Location in Syria
- Coordinates: 34°52′22″N 36°23′44″E
- Country: Syria
- Governorate: Hama
- District: Masyaf
- Subdistrict: Awj
- Elevation: 759 m (2,489 ft)

Population (2004)
  - Total: 2,495
- Time zone: UTC+3 (AST)

Akakir (Arabic: عكاكير, also spelled Akakeer) is a village in northwestern Syria, administratively part of the Hama Governorate, located southwest of Hama. Nearby localities include Kafr Ram to the west, Fahel to the south, al-Shinyah to the southeast, al-Taybah al-Gharbiyah to the east, Maryamin to the northeast and Kafr Kamrah and Awj to the north. According to the Syria Central Bureau of Statistics (CBS), Akakir had a population of 2,495 in the 2004 census. Its inhabitants are predominantly Alawites.

In 1829, during the Late Ottoman period, Akakir was part of Jabal Gharbi, a fiscal region inhabited by members of the Alawite community, and paid 1,812 qirsh to satisfy the takalif, a tax meant to cover the expenses of the annual hajj ("pilgrimage") to Mecca. This was a decrease from 1818 when the village paid 2,312 qirsh. It was classified as an Alawite village in 1838 by English scholar Eli Smith. In 1929 Akakir was one of five villages (the other three were al-Bayyadiyah, al-Rusafa, Abu Qubays and Baarin) to be ceded to the Alawite State from the qadaa ("subdistrict") of Masyaf of the Sanjak of Hama.

== Bibliography ==
- Boulanger, Robert (1966). The Middle East, Lebanon, Syria, Jordan, Iraq, Iran. Hachette.
- Clifford Edmund, Bosworth (1989). The Encyclopaedia of Islam: Fascicules 111-112 : Masrah Mawlid, Parts 111-112. BRILL. ISBN 9004092390.
- Douwes, Dick (2000). The Ottomans in Syria: a history of justice and oppression. I.B. Tauris. ISBN 1860640311.
- Robinson, E.; Smith, E. (1841). Biblical Researches in Palestine, Mount Sinai and Arabia Petraea: A Journal of Travels in the year 1838. Vol. 3. Boston: Crocker & Brewster.
