= Akrab =

Akrab may refer to:

- Akrab, Kazakhstan
- Aqrab, Syria
- Beta Scorpii, a star
