= Baida =

Baida may refer to:

== People ==
- Peter Baida (1950–1999) American short story writer
- Dmytro Vyshnevetsky (died 1563), hetman of the Ukrainian Cossacks, known as Baida in Ukrainian folk songs

== Arts and entertainment ==
- Baïda (album), by Faudel, 1997
- Baida (Ralph Alessi album), 2012
- Baida (film), a 2025 Indian Hindi-language film

== See also ==
- Bayda (disambiguation), and variants
- Ramlet al-Baida, a public beach in Beirut, Lebanon
