= Huwayr al-Turukman =

Huwayr al-Turukman حوير التركمان
- Village
- Location in Syria
- Coordinates: 34°55′40″N 36°21′2″E
- Country: Syria
- Governorate: Hama
- District: Masyaf
- Subdistrict: Awj

Population (2004)
  - Total: 1,003
- Time zone: UTC+3 (AST)
- City Qrya Pcode: C3400

Huwayr al-Turukman (Arabic: حوير التركمان, romanized: Hūwaer al-Tūrūkman); also known as Huweir is a Syrian village located in the Awj Subdistrict of the Masyaf District in Hama Governorate. According to the Syria Central Bureau of Statistics (CBS), Huwayr al-Turukman had a population of 1,003 in the 2004 census. Its inhabitants are predominantly Turkmens.

== Bibliography ==
- Smith, Eli; Robinson, Edward (1841). Biblical Researches in Palestine, Mount Sinai and Arabia Petraea: A Journal of Travels in the Year 1838. Vol. 3. Crocker and Brewster.
