= AWJ =

AWJ may refer to:

- Abrasive waterjet, a kind of water jet cutter
- Association of Women Jurists, in Human rights in the Central African Republic

== See also ==
- Awj, a village in northern Syria
