= Zor Baarin =

Zor Baarin زور بعرين
- Village
- Location in Syria
- Coordinates: 34°57′0″N 36°23′53″E
- Country: Syria
- Governorate: Hama
- District: Masyaf
- Subdistrict: Awj

Population (2004)
  - Total: 164
- Time zone: UTC+3 (AST)
- City Qrya Pcode: C3389

Zor Barin (Arabic: زور بعرين) is a Syrian village located in Awj Nahiyah in Masyaf District, Hama. According to the Syria Central Bureau of Statistics (CBS), Zor Baarin had a population of 164 in the 2004 census.
