= Khirbet Nisaf =

Khirbet Nisaf خربة نيصاف
- Village
- Location in Syria
- Coordinates: 34°57′26″N 36°22′55″E
- Country: Syria
- Governorate: Hama
- District: Masyaf
- Subdistrict: Awj

Population (2004)
  - Total: 50
- Time zone: UTC+3 (AST)
- City Qrya Pcode: C3386

Khirbet Nisaf (Arabic: خربة نيصاف) is a Syrian hamlet in Awj Nahiyah in Masyaf District, Hama. According to the Syria Central Bureau of Statistics (CBS), Khirbet Nisaf had a population of 50 as of 2004.
