= Al-Bayyadiyah =

al-Bayyadiyah البياضية Beyadiyeh
- Village
- Location in Syria
- Coordinates: 34.992914°N 36.389766°E
- Country: Syria
- Governorate: Hama
- District: Masyaf
- Subdistrict: Masyaf

Population (2004)
  - Total: 2,701
- Time zone: UTC+3 (AST)

Al-Bayyadiyah (Arabic: البياضية, also spelled Beyadiyeh) is a village in northern Syria, administratively part of the Hama Governorate, located southwest of Hama. Nearby localities include al-Bayda and district center Masyaf to the northwest, Ayn Halaqim to the southwest, Baarin and Nisaf to the south, Aqrab to the southeast and al-Muah to the east. According to the Syria Central Bureau of Statistics (CBS), al-Bayyadiyah had a population of 2,701 in the 2004 census. Its inhabitants are predominantly Alawites and Christians.
