= Bayda =

Bayda, or Al Bayda, or variants, may refer to:

== Places ==
- Bayda, Libya, or Elbeida
- Bayda (land), a desert between Mecca and Medina in Saudi Arabia
- Beida, Sudan
- Beidha (archaeological site), near Petra, Jordan
- Beidha (commune and town), Algeria
- Beyza, Iran
- Albaida, Province of Valencia, Spain
- Al-Bayda, Hama, Syria
- Al-Bayda, Tartus Governorate, Syria
- Al Bayda Governorate, Yemen
  - Al Bayda, Yemen
- Al-Bayda (Khazar city), a location in Khazar Khaganate

== People ==
- Bryan Bayda (born 1961), Canadian bishop in the Ukrainian Greek Catholic Church
- Dmitri Bayda (born 1975), Russian footballer
- Mariya Bayda (1922–2002), World War II scout in the Crimea
- Ryan Bayda (born 1980), Canadian ice hockey player

== Other uses ==
- Anthyllis cytisoides, a plant with he common name Albaida

== See also ==
- Baida (disambiguation)
- Casablanca, also known in Arabic as Dar al-Bayda, in Morocco
- Khasf al-Bayda, in Islamic eschatology
- Ramlet al-Baida, a public beach in Beirut, Lebanon
- Peking University, known as Beida
- National Taipei University, known as Beida
