= Kafr Kamra =

Kafr Kamra كفر كمرة Kfar Kamrah
- Village
- Location in Syria
- Coordinates: 34.898702°N 36.399469°E
- Country: Syria
- Governorate: Hama
- District: Masyaf
- Subdistrict: Awj

Population (2004)
  - Total: 2,895
- Time zone: UTC+3 (AST)

Kafr Kamra (Arabic: كفر كمرة, also spelled Kfar Kamrah) is a village in northern Syria, administratively part of the Hama Governorate, located west of Hama. Nearby localities include Awj to the north, Aqrab and Qarmas to the northeast, Houla to the east, Maryamin to the southeast, Akakir and Kafr Ram, Ayn Halaqim to the west and Nisaf to the northwest. According to the Syria Central Bureau of Statistics, Kafr Kamra had a population of 2,895 in the 2004 census. Its inhabitants are predominantly Alawites.

== History ==
According to the Ottoman Defter records, the population of Kafr Kamra increased substantially throughout the 16th century, from having only 8 households in 1526 to 84 households by 1594.

== Bibliography ==
- Robinson, E.; Smith, E. (1841). Biblical Researches in Palestine, Mount Sinai and Arabia Petraea: A Journal of Travels in the year 1838. Vol. 3. Boston: Crocker & Brewster.
