= U of J =

U of J may refer to:

a university in Poland

- University of Johannesburg

a university in Sri Lanka

- University of Jaffna

a university in the United States

- University of Judaism (now the American Jewish University) of Los Angeles, California

== See also ==
- UJ (disambiguation)
