= Nisaf =

Nisaf نيصاف Nasaf
- Village
- Location in Syria
- Coordinates: 34.932667°N 36.377792°E
- Country: Syria
- Governorate: Hama
- District: Masyaf
- Subdistrict: Awj
- Elevation: 470 m (1,540 ft)

Population (2004)
  - Total: 4,048
- Time zone: UTC+3 (AST)

Nisaf (Arabic: نيصاف, also spelled Nasaf) is a village in northern Syria, administratively part of the Hama Governorate, located west of Hama. Nearby localities include Kafr Kamrah to the southeast, Baarin and Taunah to the east, al-Bayyadiyah to the northeast, al-Suwaydah to the north and Ayn Halaqim to the west. According to the Syria Central Bureau of Statistics, Nisaf had a population of 4,048 in the 2004 census. Its inhabitants are predominantly Alawites. The local governing council for Nisaf was established in 1977 and it became a village council in 1999.

== Bibliography ==
- Boulanger, Robert (1966). The Middle East, Lebanon, Syria, Jordan, Iraq, Iran. Hachette.
- Robinson, E.; Smith, E. (1841). Biblical Researches in Palestine, Mount Sinai and Arabia Petraea: A Journal of Travels in the year 1838. Vol. 3. Boston: Crocker & Brewster.
