= Battle of Ba'rin =

1137 battle between Crusaders and Seljuks

Coordinates: 34.884628°N 36.438192°E

- Part of the Crusades
Date	1137
Location	Castle Montferrand, Baarin, Syria
Result	Zengid victory

Belligerents
Kingdom of Jerusalem; County of Tripoli	Zengids

Commanders and leaders
King Fulk of Jerusalem; Raymond II (POW)	Imad ad-Din Zengi

Strength
Unknown	Unknown

Casualties and losses
2,000 killed Many captured	Unknown

The Battle of Ba'rin (also known as Battle of Montferrand) in 1137 took place in Syria when a Crusader force commanded by King Fulk of Jerusalem was scattered and defeated by Zengi, the atabeg of Mosul and Aleppo. This setback resulted in the permanent loss of the Crusader castle of Montferrand in Baarin.

== Background ==
When Zengi became ruler of Mosul in 1127 and Aleppo in 1128, the Crusaders faced a dangerous opponent. For several years afterward, Zengi gained power at the expense of neighboring Muslim states. By occasionally allying itself with the Kingdom of Jerusalem, the Muslim emirate of Damascus successfully resisted Zengi's efforts to conquer that city.

== Battle ==
In 1137, Zengi invested in the castle of Ba'rin, about 10 miles northwest of Homs. Raymond II obtained help from King Fulk; however when Fulk arrived in Tripoli, he learned that the Byzantine emperor was invading the Principality of Antioch. Fulk immediately held a council and decided that Ba'rin should be helped first.

The Crusaders advanced against Zengi, whereupon Zengi decimated their infantry. Raymond II and some of his knights were captured while Fulk recognised the futility of resistance and retired into the fortress with the loss of baggage intended for Ba'rin. Chronicler William of Tyre "gave no tactical information, and neither did the Arab historians." Zengi then resumed his siege of Ba'rin while the imprisoned Franks appealed for aid to Antioch, Jerusalem, and Edessa, who answered the appeal.

== Aftermath ==
After their defeat, Fulk and some of the survivors took refuge in Montferrand castle, which Zengi surrounded again. "When they ran out of food they ate their horses, and then they were forced to ask for terms." Meanwhile, large numbers of Christian pilgrims had rallied to the army of Byzantine Emperor John II Comnenus, Raymond of Antioch and Joscelin II of Edessa.

With this host approaching the castle, Zengi suddenly granted Fulk and the other besieged Franks terms. In return for their freedom and evacuation from the castle, a ransom was set at 50,000 dinars. The Franks, unaware of the imminent arrival of the large relieving army, accepted Zengi's offer.

In April 1137, John Komnenus laid siege to Shaizar, but his efforts were unsuccessful when Zengi relieved the city in May. The Franks never recovered Ba'rin.

Muhammad ibn Nasr ibn al-Qaysarani wrote a rhyming poem praising Zengi for his victory at Ba'rin.
