= UJ =

UJ may refer to:

== Education ==
- University of Jaffna, Sri Lanka
- Jagiellonian University, Poland
- University of Jamestown, North Dakota, US
- University of Johannesburg, South Africa
- University of Jordan, Jordan
- University of Judaism, California, US

== People ==
- Og (or 'Ūj), a biblical king
- UJ Seuteni, Samoan rugby player

== Other uses ==
- Awj, a Syrian village near Hama, sometimes spelled Uj
- Microjoule (μJ, sometimes uj), a unit of energy
- Új Kelet, a Hungarian-language Zionist Jewish Newspaper
- Union Jack or Union Flag, of the United Kingdom
- Universal joint, a mechanical coupling
- Utah Jazz
