= Bishanin =

Bishanin بشنين
- Village
- Location in Syria
- Coordinates: 34°54′14″N 36°22′15″E
- Country: Syria
- Governorate: Hama
- District: Masyaf
- Subdistrict: Awj

Population (2004)
  - Total: 1,971
- Time zone: UTC+3 (AST)
- City Qrya Pcode: C3388

Bishanin (Arabic: بشنين) is a Syrian village located in the Awj Subdistrict in Masyaf District. According to the Syria Central Bureau of Statistics (CBS), Bishanin had a population of 1,971 in the 2004 census.
