= Rudaymat al-Liwa =

Rudaymat al-Liwa رضيمة اللواء Redeimat al-Liwa
- Village
- Location within Syria
- Coordinates: 33°01′18″N 36°34′51″E
- PAL: 298/270
- Country: Syria
- Governorate: Suwayda
- District: Shahba
- Subdistrict: Sawra as-Saghira

Population (2004 census)
  - Total: 1,001
- Time zone: UTC+2 (EET)
  - Summer (DST): UTC+3 (EEST)

Rudaymat al-Liwa (Arabic: رضيمة اللواء) is a village situated in the Shahba District of Suwayda Governorate, in southern Syria. According to the Syria Central Bureau of Statistics (CBS), Rudaymat al-Liwa had a population of 1,001 in the 2004 census. Its inhabitants are predominantly Druze, with a Christian minority.

== Civil war ==
In August 2025, during the southern Syria clashes, St. Paul Church in the village was robbed, vandalized, and burned by members of the Defence and Interior Ministries, aided by armed Bedouin men.

== Demographics ==
In 2011, the Melkite Greek Catholic Church had approximately 250 believers.

== Religious buildings ==
- St. Paul Melkite Greek Catholic Church

== See also ==
- Druze in Syria
- Christians in Syria
