= Taara, Suwayda =

Taara تعارة Ta‘ara
- Village
- Location within Syria
- Coordinates: 32°49′43″N 36°23′43″E
- PAL: 281/249
- Country: Syria
- Governorate: Suwayda
- District: Suwayda
- Subdistrict: Mazraa

Population (2004 census)
  - Total: 867
- Time zone: UTC+2 (EET)
  - Summer (DST): UTC+3 (EEST)

Taara (Arabic: تعارة) is a village in southern Syria, administratively part of the Suwayda Governorate. According to the Syria Central Bureau of Statistics (CBS), Taara had a population of 867 in the 2004 census. Its inhabitants are predominantly Druze, with a Christian minority.

== Civil war ==
During the southern Syria clashes in 2025, the Holy Cross Church in the village was robbed, vandalized, and burned by members of the Defence and Interior Ministries, along with armed Bedouin men.

== Demographics ==
In 2011, the Melkite Greek Catholic Church had approximately 200 believers.

== Religious buildings ==
- Holy Cross Melkite Greek Catholic Church

== See also ==
- Druze in Syria
- Christians in Syria
