= Aqrab =

Aqrab عقرب Akrab
- Town

Arab transcription(s)
  - English: "The Scorpion"
- Location in Syria
- Coordinates: 34°56′11″N 36°27′25″E
- Country: Syria
- Governorate: Hama
- District: Hama
- Subdistrict: Hirbnafsah

Population (2004)
  - Total: 24,677
- Time zone: UTC+3 (AST)

Aqrab (Arabic: عقرب, also spelled Akrab; Turkish: Akrep) is a town in central Syria, administratively part of the Hama Governorate, under the Hama District, in the Hirbnafsah sub district, located southwest of Hama at the governorate border with Homs. Nearby localities include Nisaf and Baarin to the west, Awj to the southwest, Qarmas to the south, Taldou and Houla to the southeast, Talaf and the subdistrict (nahiyah) center Hirbnafsah to the east, Bisin and Jidrin to the northeast and al-Bayyadiyah to the northwest.

== History ==
According to the Ottoman Defter records, the population of the village increased from 10 households in 1526 to 39 households by 1594. In an Ottoman government record from 1818, Aqrab was listed as one of two Turkmen villages belonging to the Qirra ('Villages') Khaliliyya; the other village was neighboring Ik'una and the two villages together consisted of 49 feddans and paid 10,350 qirsh in taxes, as well as 7,380 qirsh in illegal exactions to the mutasallim of Hama, Faraj Agha. At the time, the multazims (tax farmers) of Aqrab were locals from the village. In 1838, it was recorded as a Sunni Muslim village.

In the late 19th or early 20th centuries, Aqrab's inhabitants sold all or most of their lands to the urban notables of Hama, turning its small landowners into tenant farmers. By the early 1930s, the prominent Kaylani family of Hama were the village's owners and the inhabitants were largely Sunni Muslim Turkmens. The urban landowners of Hama, referred to as "feudalists" in a United Nations report, continued to own Aqrab as late as 1958.

=== Syrian civil war ===
Since the beginning of the ongoing Syrian civil war in 2011, several Alawite families threatened by Sunni rebel fighters have fled Aqrab for nearby predominantly Alawite villages such as Baarin. On 11 December 2012, bomb attacks in the village left between 125-200 civilians dead or wounded according to opposition activists. Most of the casualties were reportedly Alawites, and local witnesses blamed FSA rebels from Houla and al-Rastan for the killings.

== Demographics ==
According to the Syria Central Bureau of Statistics (CBS), Aqrab had a population of 8,422 in the 2004 census, making it the largest locality in the Hirbnafsah nahiyah. The population of Aqrab is roughly two-thirds Sunni Muslim, with the remainder being Alawites. Many of Aqrab's Sunni inhabitants are of Turkmen descent. The Alawite inhabitants live mostly in the enclave of Jbeili where they make up about 200 families. By August of 2018, the total population of Aqrab had declined to between 4,000 and 5,000 people.

== Bibliography ==
- Comité de l'Asie française (April 1933). "Notes sur la propriété foncière dans le Syrie centrale (Notes on Landownership in Central Syria)". Bulletin du Comité de l'Asie française (in French). 33 (309). Comité de l'Asie française: 130–136.
- Douwes, Dick (2000). The Ottomans in Syria: A History of Justice and Oppression. I.B. Tauris. ISBN 1860640311.
- Hartmann, Martin (2012). Reisebriefe aus Syrien (in German). Books on Demand. ISBN 978-3864448010.
- Robinson, E.; Smith, E. (1841). Biblical Researches in Palestine, Mount Sinai and Arabia Petraea: A Journal of Travels in the year 1838. Vol. 3. Boston: Crocker & Brewster.
