= Aqrab massacre =

Terrorist attack in Hama Governorate Syria

- Part of the Syrian civil war
- Location of Aqrab within Syria.
- Location: Aqrab, Hama Governorate, Syria
- Date: 11 December 2012
- Target: Alawite population
- Attack type: Massacre
- Weapon: Bombs/explosives
- Deaths: Unclear: 125–300 killed or wounded reported
- Perpetrator: Disputed

The Aqrab massacre is a contested event which occurred on 10/11 December 2012, during the Syrian civil war, in the Alawite section of the mixed town of Aqrab, Hama Governorate, Syria. The Syrian Observatory for Human Rights claimed that 125 people were killed or wounded in those events, while other activists claimed that as many as 300 people were killed. Activists said that they could confirm the deaths of 10 people.

== Background ==
In 2011 an uprising began in Syria against the government. A multitude of events include military sieges and the formation of the Free Syrian Army, the events turned into the Syrian civil war. As the ethnic and religious composition was mixed both sides had support from various factions. The ruling party has numerous political leaders belonging to the Alawite minority in Syria, but neither side of the conflict had labeled sectarianism as a major cause of the conflict.

== Bombings ==
The UK-based pro-opposition Syrian Observatory for Human Rights (SOHR) said that multiple attacks killed or wounded 125 civilians, mostly Alawites, in Aqrab.

The SOHR initially blamed pro-Assad forces for committing the massacre, based on testimony by Alawites held by the FSA. However, Alex Thomson, the first western journalist to reach Aqrab, reported that eyewitnesses not held by FSA blamed foreign Islamists and FSA fighters from Houla and Al-Rastan.

Another Alawite resident, from the nearby town of Masyaf, blamed the attack on rebels stating that they did not believe there was a massacre, but that they thought the rebels were holding a number of hostages. According to him, the clashes started when the rebels shelled a Shabiha militia checkpoint in the town. In contrast, a rebel claimed that the Syrian army shelled a house where between 200 and 500 Alawites were hiding in.

The next day, the casualty counts still varied but several activists said that they could confirm the deaths of 10 people. SOHR director Rami Abdel Rahma stated that "We cannot know whether the rebels were behind this attack, but if they were, this would be the largest-scale revenge attack against Alawites". Anti-government activists also claimed that wounded Alawite children came to an opposition-run field hospital in the Sunni rebel region of Houla.

On 14 December, Alex Thomson of Britain's Channel 4 News filled a report after he managed to travel to the outskirts of Aqrab. He interviewed three people who claimed to have escaped from the village to government-controlled territory, without the presence of any government minders. All three blamed the rebels, not the pro-government Alawite militia, for the killing of Alawites in their village. The report also suggested that there was no massacre at all and Thomson noted that conversations with a dozen other Alawites who had fled from Aqrab further backed up the three witnesses. According to them, hundreds of civilians were trapped in one building, besieged by the rebels, for more than a week. They stated "the rebels wanted to take the women and children to al-Houla to use them as human shields against bombardment from government forces, and they believed they would kill the remaining men". Although the negotiations to free all of the people in the building failed, a number of people were released before some were killed and others were taken to Houla.

== See also ==
- 2025 massacres of Syrian Alawites
- List of massacres during the Syrian civil war
