= Baarin =

Baarin بعرين Bi'rin
- Village
- Location in Syria
- Coordinates: 34°56′29″N 36°24′46″E
- Country: Syria
- Governorate: Hama
- District: Masyaf
- Subdistrict: Awj
- Elevation: 400 m (1,300 ft)

Population (2004)
  - Total: 5,559
- Time zone: UTC+3 (AST)

Baarin (Arabic: بعرين, Baʿrīn or Biʿrīn) is a village in northern Syria, administratively part of the Hama Governorate, located in Homs Gap roughly 38 kilometers (24 mi) southwest of Hama. Nearby localities include Taunah and Awj to the south, Aqrab and Houla to the southeast, Nisaf, Ayn Halaqim and Wadi al-Uyun to the west, Masyaf, Deir Mama and Mahrusah to the north, and Deir al-Fardis and al-Rastan to the east. According to the Syria Central Bureau of Statistics (CBS), Baarin had a population of 5,559 in the 2004 census. Baarin is also the largest locality in the Awj nahiyah ("subdistrict") which comprises thirteen villages with a population of 33,344. The village's inhabitants are predominantly Alawites.

Today, Baarin spans about 2,923 hectares (7,220 acres) between houses, commercial buildings and agricultural land. The village is built on the hillside below the medieval fortress of Baarin, and is situated along the main road between Masyaf and Hama. The majority of the inhabitants are farmers, while the rest work in services and trade. The main water source of the village is the nearby al-Tannur spring.

== History ==
=== Medieval period ===
In the early 12th-century Baarin served as a fortress of the Crusaders who referred to it as "Mons Ferrandus" or "Montferrand." In 1133 Pons, Count of Tripoli escaped to Baarin for refuge where, according to chronicler William of Tyre, he was shortly besieged by the Muslim army of Aleppo led by Zangi before being rescued by King Fulk of Jerusalem.

After a failed attempt to capture Homs, in July 1137 Zangi besieged Baarin's fortress. However, the main purpose of the offensive was not to land a blow to the Crusaders, but rather, to increase the southward expansion of Zangi's kingdom towards Damascus, which was ruled by a rival Muslim dynasty, and nearby Homs which was protected by Damascus. Fulk and Raymond of Tripoli attempted to relieve Baarin, but were preempted by Zangi's forces who engaged them in the hills outside the fortress. Raymond was captured, but Fulk managed to find safe haven in Baarin. Afterward Zangi renewed the siege. News that further Crusader reinforcements from Jerusalem and Tripoli were approaching compelled Zangi to accept Baarin's capitulation in late August, an act he had refused earlier. The Crusaders' garrison in the fortress had been unaware of the arrival of reinforcements. The besieged garrison were allowed to exit, prisoners were released and the strategic fortress of Baarin, which had been a source of disruption for Muslim forces, fell to Zangi's control.

In the summer of 1138 Zangi once again attempted to capture Homs and managed to successfully negotiate an agreement with that town's ruler Shihab al-Din Mahmud whereby Homs would be ceded to Zangi in return for Mahmud's possession of Baarin and another two fortresses in the area. In August 1142 Raymond of Tripoli granted a number of fiefs to the Knights Hospitaller, including Baarin. However, there is no record suggesting that the Crusaders captured the fortress from the Muslims by that time, suggesting that the revenues of the district of Baarin were at least partially under Crusader control or treated that way by Tripoli.

Between May–June 1175 the Ayyubid army, under Sultan Saladin's command, captured Baarin from the Zengid ruler Izz al-Din ibn al-Za'frani who controlled no other fiefs. In 1178 Saladin transferred the fiefs of Baarin, Kafartab, and lands in Maarrat al-Nu'man to his ally Shams al-Din Ali from the Banu al-Daya family as compensation for forcefully removing him from the valuable fortress of Baalbek. In 1198 the Ayyubid ruler of Aleppo and Saladin's son az-Zahir Ghazi, allocated Baarin as a fief to al-Mansur ibn Turanshah. In 1202-03 a treaty was established between the Ayyubid rivals al-Adil I of Egypt (Saladin's brother) and az-Zahir whereby al-Mansur would remain in control of Baarin and the nearby towns of Hama and Salamiyah.

During a conflict between the Ayyubid rulers of Egypt and Hama, Nasir Kilij-Arslan of Hama was imprisoned by al-Kamil of Egypt and only released when Kilij-Arslan handed Hama over to his brother al-Muzaffar II Mahmud. Baarin remained in Kilij-Arslan's control. In 1229 the Hospitallers raided Baarin in response to a raid by the Ayyubid sultan al-Kamil (al-Adil's successor) against the Crusader-held Krak des Chevaliers (Hisn al-Akrad) fortress. In late 1230 the Crusaders launched another attack against Baarin, plundering the town and other villages in its district. Men and women were taken captive, as well as a large group of Turkomans.

During the Mamluk era Baarin served as one of three chief administrative towns in the mamlaka ("province") of Hama after the city of Hama itself. In 1301 a hailstorm hit the area of Baarin. In the 14th century the town was visited by Syrian-Ayyubid historian and geographer, Abu'l-Fida, who described it as having "springs round it and gardens, and lies 1 march west, and rather south of Hamah. There are near here the remains of an ancient town called Ar Rafaniyyah (Raphanea), much celebrated in history. Hisn (the fort) of Barin was built by the Franks in 480 and odd (about 1090). The Muslims afterwards took it and kept it awhile, and then dismantled it." Until 1496-97 immigrants from Baarin to Hama were forced to reside in the same area and were taxed collectively. This practice ended when a decree abolished the collective tax and permitted Baarin migrants to live where they chose.

=== Modern era ===
Swiss traveler John Lewis Burckhardt passed through Baarin in the beginning of the 19th century, during Ottoman rule, describing it as "ruined castle." In 1838 English scholar Eli Smith classified Baarin as an Alawite village. Baarin was visited by Albert Socin in the early 20th century. Between the 18th and 19th centuries, Baarin was one of the two villages in the Sanjak of Hama to form its own muqata'ah, a fiscal entity (normally a cluster of villages) that served as a tax farm. The other single-village muqata'a was Kafroun. Between 1815 and 1890, there were two reported incidents related to a blood feud between the residents of the village and the Bedouin tribe of al-Turki, where members of the latter killed villagers. In these cases diyya ("blood money") was paid to settle the conflict.

In the early 1960s it was described as a large village and the fortress was completely destroyed. When author and expert in Ismai'li studies Peter Willey visited Baarin in a 1970 expedition, he noted the town's large medieval castle was mostly in ruins, "although it must have been a substantial building."

In late October 2011, several Syrian security forces personnel from Baarin were killed in clashes with opposition rebels or roadside bomb attacks during the Syrian Civil War. According to free-lance journalist Nir Rosen, tensions existed between Baarin and the Sunni-majority village cluster of Houla to the east. Baarin hosted a number of Alawite families fleeing Aqrab after apparent intimidation by that village's residents.
