= Kafr al-Luhuf =

Kafr al-Luhuf كفر اللحف
- Village
- Location within Syria
- Coordinates: 32°48′24″N 36°32′04″E
- Grid position: 304/227
- Country: Syria
- Governorate: Suwayda
- District: Suwayda
- Subdistrict: Suwayda

Population (2004 census)
  - Total: 1,375
- Time zone: UTC+2 (EET)
  - Summer (DST): UTC+3 (EEST)

Kafr al-Luhuf (Arabic: كفر اللحف) is a village in southern Syria, administratively part of the Suwayda District of the Suwayda Governorate. According to the Syria Central Bureau of Statistics (CBS), Kafr al-Luhuf had a population of 1,375 in the 2004 census. Its inhabitants are predominantly Druze, with a Sunni Muslim Bedouin minority.

It is located at Latitude 32° 48' 24N and Longitude 36° 32' 4E and has an altitude of 2864ft (872m). Kafr al-Luhuf close to the villages of Arḑ al Ḩumr and Arḑ al Ḩazāyir.

== Religious buildings ==
- Maqam Prophet Yahya (Druze Shrine)

== See also ==
- Druze in Syria
