= Hazzour =

Hazzour خربة حزور Khirbat Hazzur
- Village
- Nickname: Khirbat-Hazzour
- Location in Syria
- Coordinates: 34°55′16″N 36°19′7″E
- Country: Syria
- Governorate: Hama
- District: Masyaf
- Subdistrict: Ayn Halaqim

Population (2004)
  - Total: 479
- Time zone: UTC+3 (AST)
- City Qrya Pcode: C3409

Hazzour (Arabic: خربة حزور, also known as Hazzur or Khirbat-Hazzour) is a Syrian village located in the Ayn Halaqim Subdistrict in Masyaf District, located southwest of Hama. According to the Syria Central Bureau of Statistics (CBS), Hazzour had a population of 479 in the 2004 census. Its inhabitants are predominantly Christians.
