= Beida, West Darfur =

Beida (also transliterated Al Beyda') is a common village name in the Darfur region of Sudan. The map linked below shows several. The largest populated place by this name is a large town and refugee center on the border with Chad at 12°42′40″N 21°53′20″E. This town is also spelled Bardai, a spelling originally appearing on a 1929 British map of the area, later reprinted by the US Army Map Service in 1951 as Series Y501 Sheet 53-O at 1:250,000 scale.
