= Akrab, Kazakhstan =

Akrab Ақырап Акрабский اكراب
- Location within Kazakhstan
- Coordinates: 50°33′24″N 55°11′29″E
- Country: Kazakhstan
- Region: Aktobe
- Elevation: 111 m (364 ft)
- Time zone: UTC+5 (West Kazakhstan Time)
  - Summer (DST): UTC+5 (West Kazakhstan Time)

Akrab (also known as Aqyrap (Kazakh: Ақырап, Aqyrap, اكراب; Russian: Акрабский, Akrabskiy) is a town in Aktobe Region, west Kazakhstan. It lies at an altitude of 111 m (364 ft).
