= Ad-Duwayra =

Ad-Duwayra الدويرة Ad-Duwaira, Ad-Duweira, Ad-Dweira
- Village
- Location within Syria
- Coordinates: 32°50′54″N 36°23′50″E
- Grid position: 281/251
- Country: Syria
- Governorate: Suwayda
- District: Suwayda
- Subdistrict: Mazraa

Population (2004 census)
  - Total: 950
- Time zone: UTC+2 (EET)
  - Summer (DST): UTC+3 (EEST)

Ad-Duwayra (Arabic: الدويرة) is a village in southern Syria, administratively part of the Suwayda Governorate. According to the Syria Central Bureau of Statistics (CBS), Ad-Duwayra had a population of 950 in the 2004 census. Its inhabitants are predominantly Druze, with Christian and Sunni Muslim Bedouin minorities.

== History ==
In 1596 it appeared in the Ottoman tax registers as ad-Dur as part of the nahiya of Badi Sarma in the Qada of Hauran. It had an all Muslim population consisting of 60 households and 35 bachelors. The villagers paid a fixed tax rate of 40% on various agricultural products, including wheat (4500 a.), barley (1800 a.), summer crops (1500 a.) goats and/or beehives, in addition to "occasional revenues" (200 a.); a total of 8,000 akçe.

In 1838, Eli Smith noted it under the name of ed-Duweirah, and that the inhabitants were predominantly Druse and Catholic Christians.

== Civil war ==
During the southern Syria clashes in 2025, the St. George Church in the village was robbed, vandalized, and burned by members of the Defence and Interior Ministries, along with armed Bedouin men.

== Demographics ==
In 2011, the Melkite Greek Catholic Church had approximately 100 believers.

== Religious buildings ==
- St. George of the Melkite Greek Catholic Church
- Mosque
- Maqam Baha al-Din (Druze Shrine)

== See also ==
- Druze in Syria
- Christians in Syria

== Bibliography ==
- Hütteroth, W.-D.; Abdulfattah, K. (1977). Historical Geography of Palestine, Transjordan and Southern Syria in the Late 16th Century. Erlanger Geographische Arbeiten, Sonderband 5. Erlangen, Germany: Vorstand der Fränkischen Geographischen Gesellschaft. ISBN 3-920405-41-2.
- Robinson, E.; Smith, E. (1841). Biblical Researches in Palestine, Mount Sinai and Arabia Petraea: A Journal of Travels in the year 1838. Vol. 3. Boston: Crocker & Brewster.
