= Montferrand (crusader castle) =

- Baarin, Syria

Site information
- Type: Castle
- Condition: Ruins

Location
- Coordinates: 34°57′1″N 36°24′58″E

Montferrand was a fortress in the County of Tripoli (at the present-day village of Baarin in Syria), built in 1126.

== History ==
The construction of Montferrand started when the united crusader troops from Jerusalem, Tripoli and Antioch laid siege to Rafaniya on 13 March 1126. Originally, it was destined to complete the blockade of Rafaniya and to secure the protection of the besiegers. Rafaniya fell to the crusaders on 31 March.

Count Raymond II of Tripoli granted his claims to Montferrand and Rafaniya to the Knights Hospitallers in 1142 to persuade them to make efforts to recapture it. In 1238/9, the Ayyubid emir of Hama, Al-Muzaffar Mahmud, decided to raze the citadel to the ground.

== See also ==
- List of Crusader castles

== Sources ==
- Barber, Malcolm (2012). The Crusader States. Yale University Press. ISBN 978-0-300-11312-9.
- Lewis, Kevin James (2017). The Counts of Tripoli and Lebanon in the Twelfth Century: Sons of Saint-Gilles. Routledge. ISBN 978-1-4724-5890-2.
