= Ad-Dour =

Ad-Dour الدور
- Village
- Location within Syria
- Coordinates: 32°48′06″N 36°24′06″E
- Grid position: 281/245
- Country: Syria
- Governorate: Suwayda
- District: Suwayda
- Subdistrict: Mazraa

Population (2004 census)
  - Total: 1,412
- Time zone: UTC+2 (EET)
  - Summer (DST): UTC+3 (EEST)

Ad-Dour (Arabic: الدور) is a village in southern Syria, administratively part of the Suwayda Governorate. According to the Syria Central Bureau of Statistics (CBS), Ad-Dour had a population of 1,412 in the 2004 census. Its inhabitants are predominantly Druze, with a Sunni Muslim Bedouin minority.

== History ==
During early Ottoman Empire, in 1596 it appeared in the Ottoman tax registers as "Dur" and was part of the nahiya (subdistrict) of Bani Sarma in the Hauran Sanjak. At that time it had an entirely Muslim population of 11 households and 3 bachelors, a total of 14 taxable units, who paid fixed tax rate of 20% of various agricultural products, such as wheat (3000 a), barley (900 a.), summer crops (2100 a.), goats and beehives (230 a.), in addition to tax on a water mill (230 a.); a total of 6,600 akçe. 3/4 of the revenue went to a Waqf.

== See also ==
- Druze in Syria

== Bibliography ==
- Hütteroth, W.-D.; Abdulfattah, K. (1977). Historical Geography of Palestine, Transjordan and Southern Syria in the Late 16th Century. Erlanger Geographische Arbeiten, Sonderband 5. Erlangen, Germany: Vorstand der Fränkischen Geographischen Gesellschaft. ISBN 3-920405-41-2.
