= Jidrin =

Jidrin جدرين
- Village
- Location in Syria
- Coordinates: 34°57′4″N 36°34′56″E
- Country: Syria
- Governorate: Hama
- District: Hama
- Subdistrict: Hirbnafsah

Population (2004)
  - Total: 1,215
- Time zone: UTC+3 (AST)
- City Qrya Pcode: C3061

Jidrin (Arabic: جدرين, also spelled Jadrin) is a Syrian village located in the Hirbnafsah Subdistrict in Hama District. According to the Syria Central Bureau of Statistics (CBS), Jidrin had a population of 1,215 in the 2004 census. Its inhabitants are predominantly Alawites. It was recorded as a Sunni Muslim village in 1838.

== Bibliography ==
- Robinson, E.; Smith, E. (1841). Biblical Researches in Palestine, Mount Sinai and Arabia Petraea: A Journal of Travels in the year 1838. Vol. 3. Boston: Crocker & Brewster.
