= Al-Bayda, Hama =

Al-Bayda البيضا
- Village
- Location in Syria
- Coordinates: 35°02′17″N 36°20′14″E
- Country: Syria
- Governorate: Hama
- District: Masyaf
- Subdistrict: Masyaf
- Elevation: 510 m (1,670 ft)

Population (2004)
  - Total: 1,173
- Time zone: UTC+3 (AST)

Al-Bayda (Arabic: البيضا) is a village in northwestern Syria located west of Hama, 95 km (59 mi) southeast of the port city of Latakia, and 210 km (130 mi) north of Damascus. It is administratively part of the Hama Governorate. Nearby localities include Masyaf 2 kilometers to the north, al-Suwaydah to the southeast, Ayn Halaqim to the south, and Wadi al-Oyun to the southwest. According to the Syria Central Bureau of Statistics (CBS), al-Bayda had a population of 1,173 in the 2004 census. Its inhabitants are almost exclusively Greek Orthodox Christians.

== History ==
Al-Bayda was founded by Ibrahim Bolous Ghanemeh in about 1730. The town is home to the St. Gawargeos church, which was built in 1814.

== Economy ==
Most of Al-Bayda's residents work in agriculture, tourism, or for the government.

== See also ==
- Bayda (disambiguation)
