= Al-Bitar =

Al-Bitar البطار
- Village
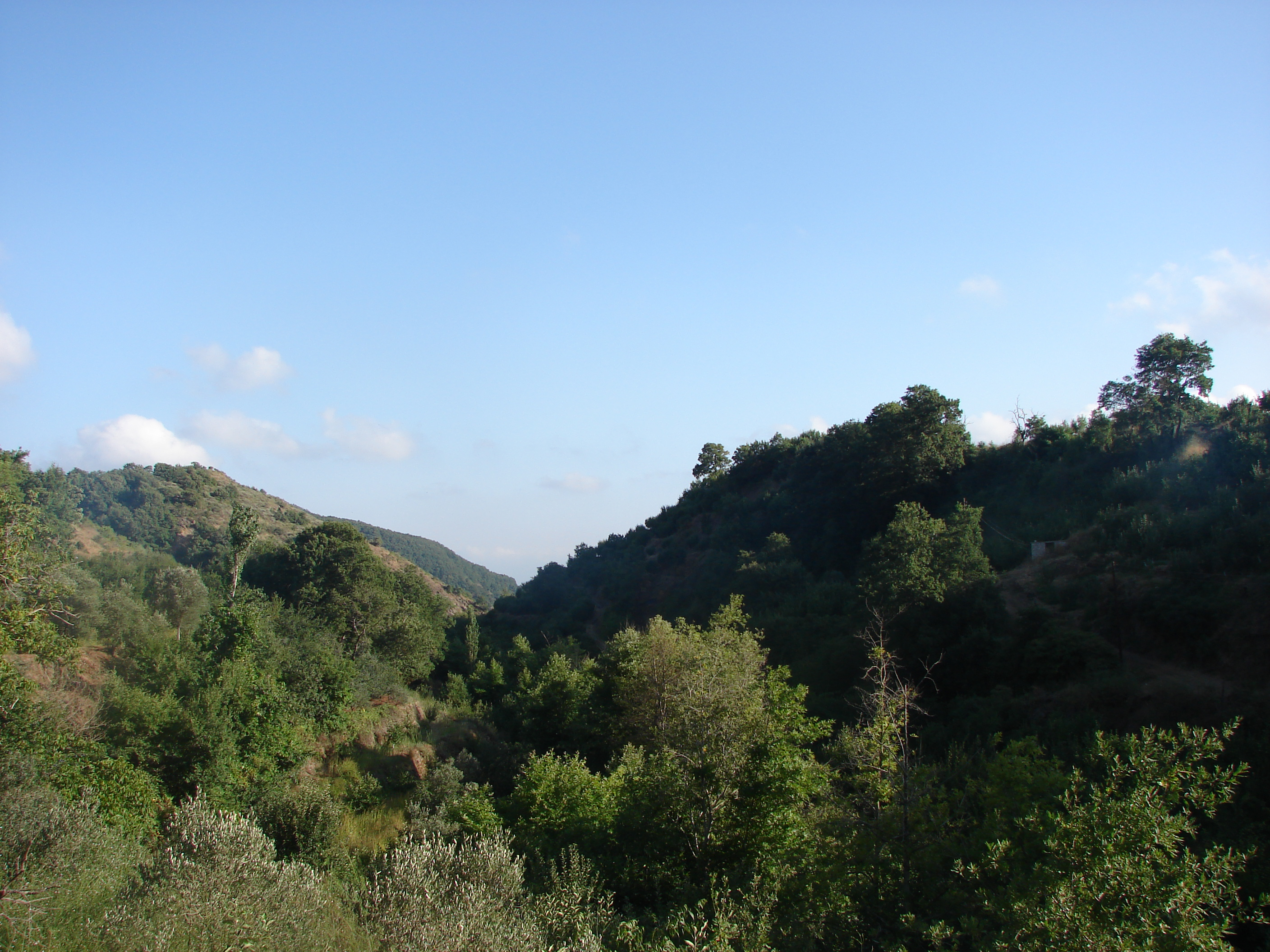
- Al-Bitar in the summer

- Location in Syria
- Coordinates: 34°52′29″N 36°19′11″E
- Country: Syria
- Governorate: Tartus Governorate
- District: Safita District
- Nahiyah: Mashta al-Helu
- Elevation: 700 m (2,300 ft)

Population (2004)
  - Total: 1,225

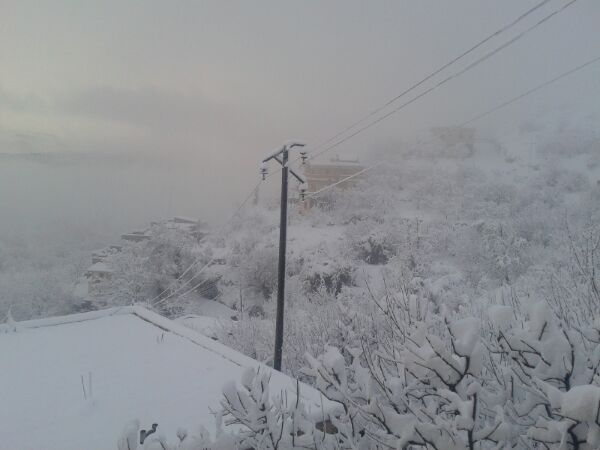
A snowy morning at al-Bitar, January 2013

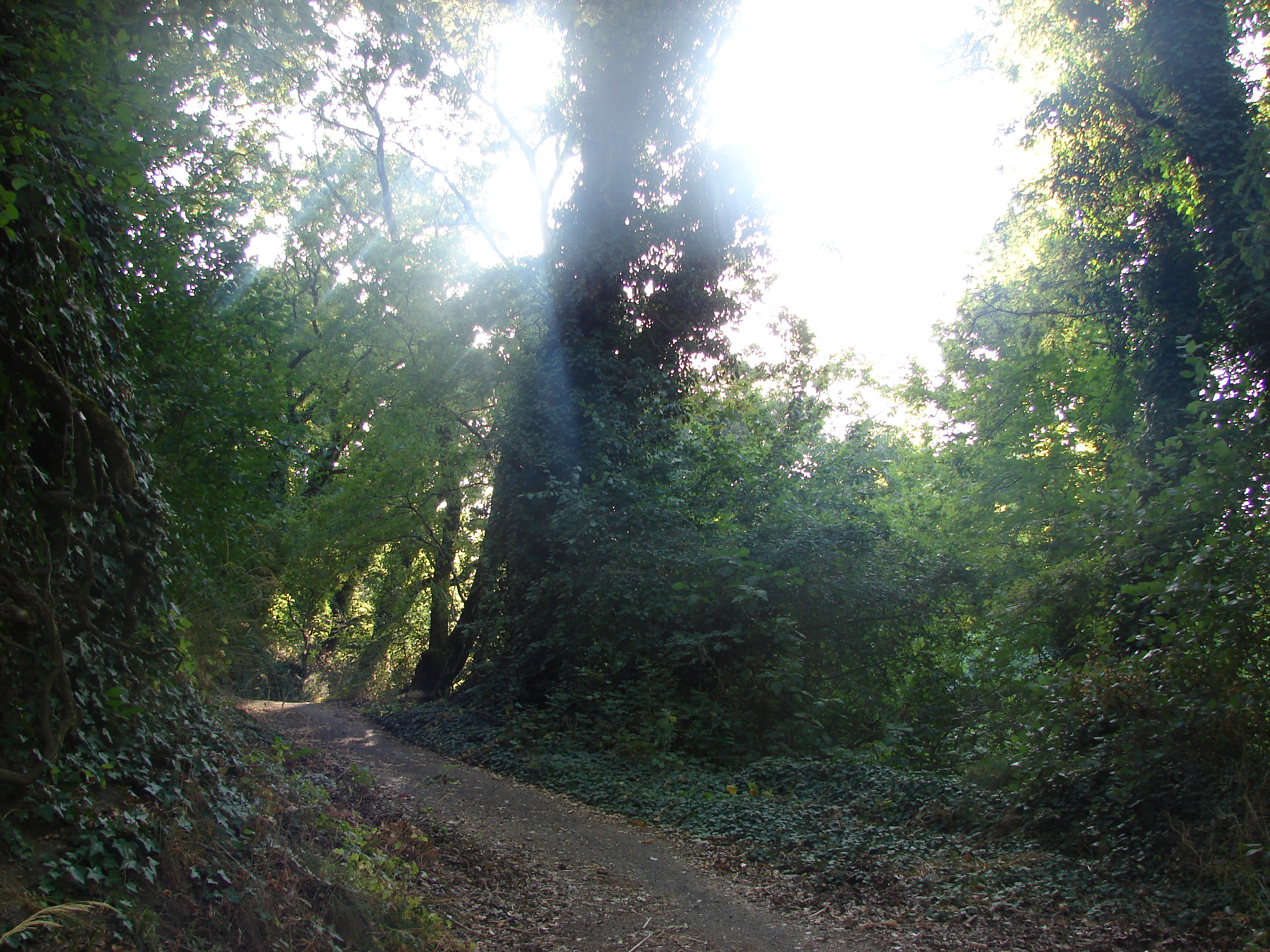
Inside al-Bitar Forest

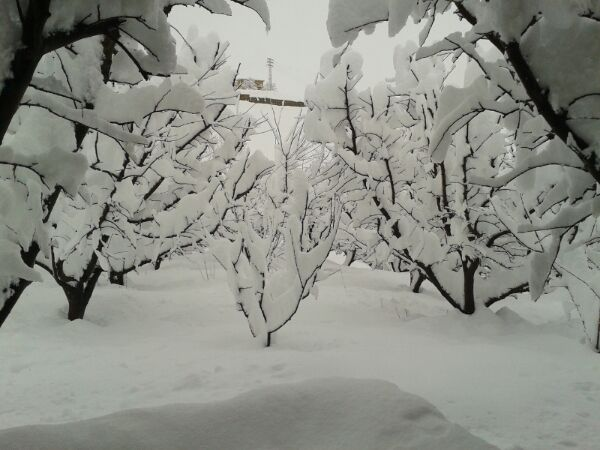
It is not unusual to have a white Christmas in Al Btar

Al-Bitar (Arabic: البطار) is a village in the Tartus Governorate nesting at one of the Coastal Mountain Range peaks at an altitude of about 1000m above mean sea level. Al-Bitar is located about 7 km from Mashta al-Helu town and resort, 60 km from Homs, 50 km from Tartus and about 215 km from the capital city Damascus. The village itself elevates about 700m above mean sea level, while some of its peaks reaches 1000m. According to the Syria Central Bureau of Statistics (CBS), al-Bitar had a population of 1,225 in the 2004 census. Its inhabitants are predominantly Christians, of the Greek Orthodox Church.

== Economy ==
Apple farms are the backbone of al-Bitar's economy and have been the major income for the residents since the villagers decided to replace the previously predominant vain and fig trees, with apple around the 1950s of the last century. There are still a lot of vain, fig and other fruit trees but mainly for personal consumption. In addition to eating and preserving, the locals use the grapes to make triple distilled Arak. Most fruits are used also to make different sorts of jams and jellies. Farms are mostly terraces and as the region enjoy a lot of rain between September and March, hence farms are mainly rained. Most of the apple produced in the village is either golden delicious or red delicious and many regard it among the tastier in the world due to the water and soil.

Some of the farmers dedicate part of their farms for wheat and corns, mainly for personal use. Wheat is used mostly to produce bulgur, which makes the main dishes all over the year; whether as a standalone meal, next to other meals or part of other meals; such as tabbouleh, kibbeh, mujaddara and many others. The soil fertility and Mediterranean climate, combined with the habit of keeping animal farms for milk, egg and meat, allow the locals to enjoy a great level of self-sufficiency.
