= Peter Baida =

American writer (1950–1999)

- Born: July 26, 1950; Baltimore, Maryland
- Died: December 14, 1999 (aged 49)
- Education: Park School of Baltimore; Harvard College; Boston University; University of Pennsylvania
- Occupation: Short story writer

Peter Baida (July 26, 1950 – December 14, 1999) was an American short story writer.

== Life ==
Baida was born in Baltimore, Maryland and graduated from the Park School of Baltimore. He graduated from Harvard College (B.A., magna cum laude, English, 1972), Boston University (M.A., 1973, creative writing), and the University of Pennsylvania with an M.B.A. in 1979.

He was the Memorial Sloan-Kettering Cancer Center's director of direct mail fundraising from 1984 through 1999.

His work appeared in The Missouri Review,

A writer-in-residence fellowship is named for him at the Park School of Baltimore.

== Awards ==
- 1999 O. Henry Award

== Works ==
=== Short stories ===
- A nurse's story, and others. University Press of Mississippi. 2001. ISBN 978-1-57806-318-5.

=== Non-fiction ===
- Poor Richard's legacy: American business values from Benjamin Franklin to Donald Trump. W. Morrow. 1990. ISBN 978-0-688-07729-7.

=== Anthologies ===
- Ruth L. Nadelhaft; Victoria Bonebakker, eds. (2008). "The Nurse's Story". Imagine what it's like: a literature and medicine anthology. University of Hawaii Press. ISBN 978-0-8248-3317-6.

=== Essays ===
- "The Fear of Getting Caught", American Heritage Magazine, Jun 22, 1987
- Peter Baida, "Review of Sinclair Lewis, If I Were Boss, The Early Business Stories of Sinclair Lewis," Economic History, Dec 7 1997
