= Taunah =

Taunah التاعونة
- Village
- Location in Syria
- Coordinates: 34°55′51″N 36°25′52″E
- Country: Syria
- Governorate: Hama
- District: Masyaf
- Subdistrict: Awj

Population (2004)
  - Total: 1,056
- Time zone: UTC+3 (AST)
- City Qrya Pcode: C3387

Taunah (Arabic: التاعونة) is a Syrian village located in the Awj Subdistrict in Masyaf District. According to the Syria Central Bureau of Statistics (CBS), Taunah had a population of 1,056 in the 2004 census. Its inhabitants are predominantly Alawites.
