= Sami' =

Sami‘ سميع Samei, Sumei
- Village
- Location within Syria
- Coordinates: 32°47′16″N 36°25′10″E
- Grid position: 283/244
- Country: Syria
- Governorate: Suwayda
- District: Suwayda
- Subdistrict: Mazraa

Population (2004 census)
  - Total: 1,097
- Time zone: UTC+2 (EET)
  - Summer (DST): UTC+3 (EEST)

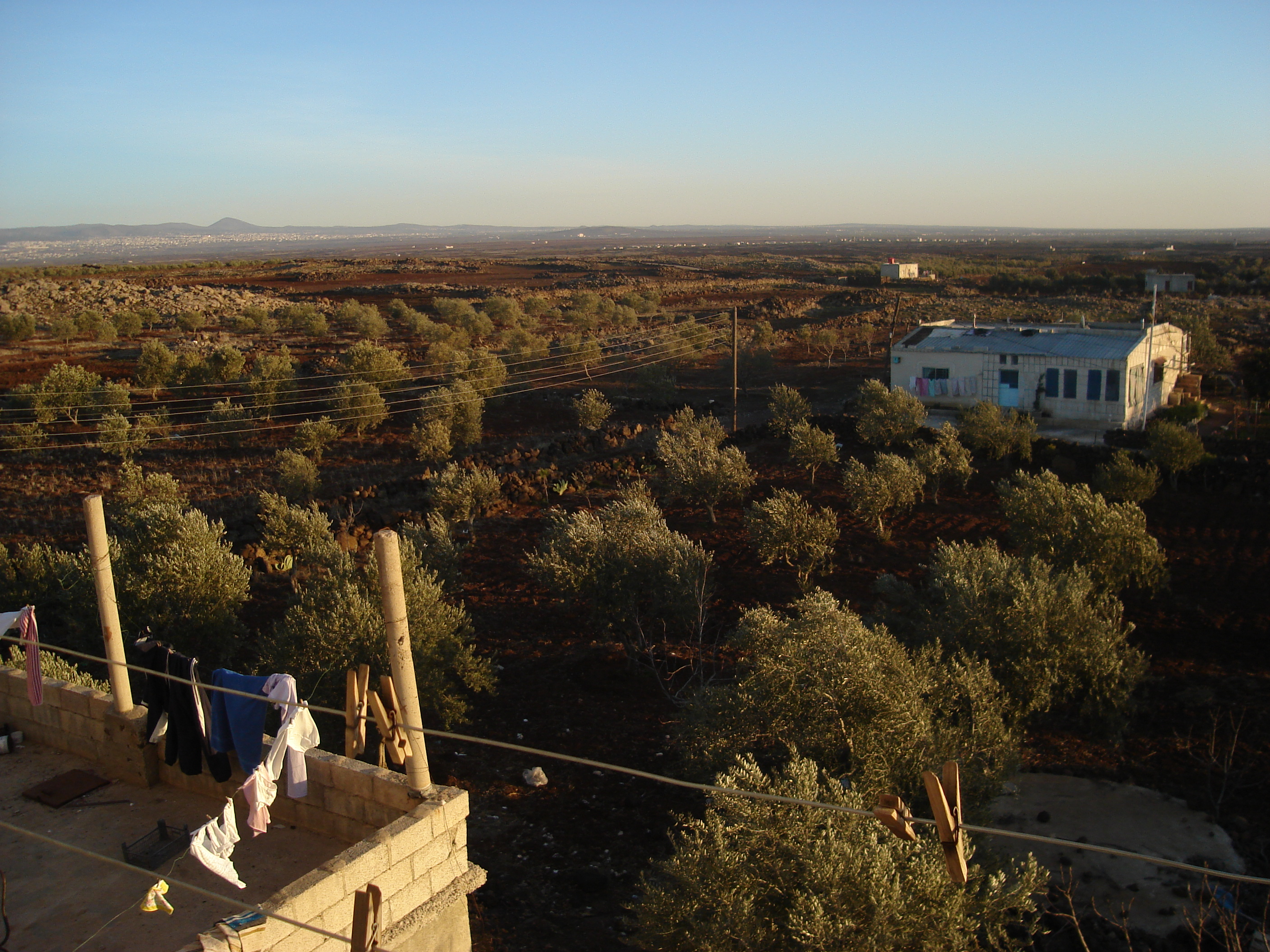
Sami' village

Sami‘ (Arabic: سميع, also spelled Samei or Sumei) is a village in southern Syria, administratively part of the Suwayda Governorate. According to the Syria Central Bureau of Statistics (CBS), Sami' had a population of 1,097 in the 2004 census. Its inhabitants are predominantly Druze.

Sami' has been identified with Saemeas (Σαεμεας) mentioned in the Diocletianic boundary stones from the Hauran and dated to about 300 CE.

== See also ==
- Druze in Syria
