= Rimat al-Luhuf =

Rimat al-Luhuf ريمة اللحف، ريمة الفخور Rimat al-Fukhour
- Village
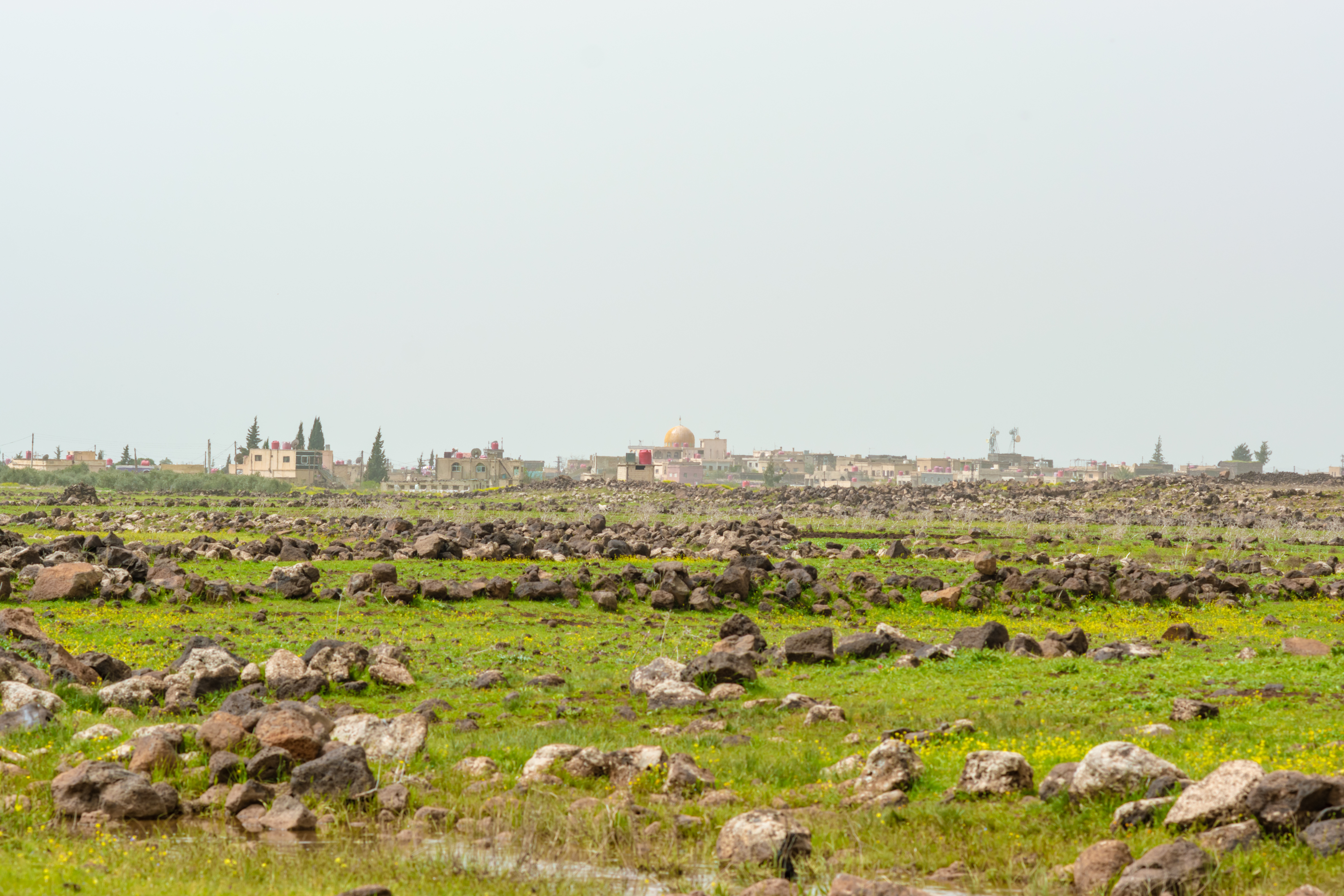

- Location within Syria
- Coordinates: 32°50′02″N 36°31′26″E
- Grid position: 293/249
- Country: Syria
- Governorate: Suwayda
- District: Suwayda
- Subdistrict: Mazraa

Population (2004 census)
  - Total: 1,925
- Time zone: UTC+2 (EET)
  - Summer (DST): UTC+3 (EEST)

Rimat al-Luhuf (Arabic: ريمة اللحف), also known as Rimat al-Fukhour (Arabic: ريمة الفخور) is a village in southern Syria, administratively part of the Suwayda Governorate. According to the Syria Central Bureau of Statistics (CBS), Rimat al-Luhuf had a population of 1,925 in the 2004 census. Its inhabitants are predominantly Druze, with a Sunni Muslim Bedouin minority. Most of the Bedouins reside in the northern part of the village, an area known as Al-Manshiyah.

== History ==
Rimat al-Luhuf is identified with the ancient village of Rimea, which is attested in inscriptions found in the Roman-era sanctuary of Aumos, a local sun god associated with Zeus, located a few kilometers away at Dayr al-Laban. Two individuals from the village mentioned in the inscriptions are said to belong to a tribe called the Khastenoi.

In 1596 the village appeared in the Ottoman tax registers named Rimat al-Halahil, part of the nahiya (Subdistrict) of Bani Nasiyya in the Hauran Sanjak. It had a Muslim population consisting of 43 households and 17 bachelors, and a Christian population consisting of 14 households and 7 bachelors; a total of 81 taxable units. They paid a fixed tax-rate of 40% on agricultural products, including wheat (6000 a.), barley (1800 a.), summer crops (1200 a.), goats and beehives (250 a.), in addition to "occasional revenues" (150 a.); a total of 9,400 akçe. 2/3 of the revenue went to a waqf.

In 1838, Eli Smith noted that inhabitants of Rimet el-Luhf were predominantly Druse and Catholic Christians.

== Religious buildings ==
- Maqam Al-Miqdad ibn Amr (Druze Shrine)
- Mosque

== See also ==
- Druze in Syria

== Bibliography ==
- Hütteroth, W.-D.; Abdulfattah, K. (1977). Historical Geography of Palestine, Transjordan and Southern Syria in the Late 16th Century. Erlanger Geographische Arbeiten, Sonderband 5. Erlangen, Germany: Vorstand der Fränkischen Geographischen Gesellschaft. ISBN 3-920405-41-2.
- Robinson, E.; Smith, E. (1841). Biblical Researches in Palestine, Mount Sinai and Arabia Petraea: A Journal of Travels in the year 1838. Vol. 3. Boston: Crocker & Brewster.
