= Qarrasa =

Qarrasa قراصة
- Village
- Location within Syria
- Coordinates: 32°49′49″N 36°24′55″E
- Grid position: 282/249
- Country: Syria
- Governorate: Suwayda
- District: Suwayda
- Subdistrict: Mazraa

Population (2004 census)
  - Total: 638
- Time zone: UTC+2 (EET)
  - Summer (DST): UTC+3 (EEST)

Qarrasa (Arabic: قراصة), is a village in southern Syria, administratively part of the Suwayda Governorate. According to the Syria Central Bureau of Statistics (CBS), Qarrasa had a population of 638 in the 2004 census. Its inhabitants are predominantly Druze.

== Religious buildings ==
- Maqam Yasu/Jesus (Druze Shrine)

== See also ==
- Druze in Syria
