= Awj =

Awj عوج
- Town
- Location in Syria
- Coordinates: 34.911062°N 36.407998°E
- Country: Syria
- Governorate: Hama
- District: Masyaf
- Subdistrict: Awj

Population (2004)
  - Total: 4,222
  - Religions: Alawite
- Time zone: UTC+3 (AST)

Awj (Arabic: عوج, also spelled Ouj or Uj) is a village in northern Syria, administratively part of the Hama Governorate, located in the Homs Gap southwest of Hama. Nearby localities include Aqrab and Tell Dahab to the east, Nisaf and Baarin to the north, Ayn Halaqim to the northwest, and Kafr Kamrah and Rabah to the south. According to the Syria Central Bureau of Statistics, Awj had a population of 4,222 in the 2004 census. Its inhabitants are predominantly Alawites.

== Bibliography ==
- Douwes, Dick (2000). The Ottomans in Syria: a history of justice and oppression. I.B. Tauris. ISBN 1860640311.
