= Al-Suwaydah, Masyaf =

As-Suwayda السويدة Soweida, Sweideh, Swaida
- Village
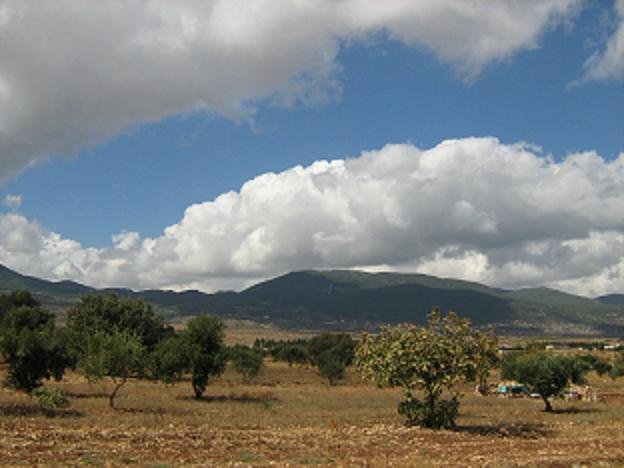

- Location in Syria
- Coordinates: 35°1′20″N 36°22′21″E
- Country: Syria
- Governorate: Hama
- District: Masyaf District
- Subdistrict: Masyaf Nahiyah

Population (2004)
  - Total: 2,703
- Time zone: UTC+3 (AST)
- City Qrya Pcode: C3341

As-Suwayda (Arabic: السويدة, also spelled Soweideh or Sweideh or Swaida) is a Syrian village located in the Masyaf Subdistrict in Masyaf District, located west of Hama. According to the Syria Central Bureau of Statistics (CBS), As-Suwayda had a population of 2,703 in the 2004 census. Its inhabitants are predominantly Alawites.
