= Barshin =

Barshin برشين
- Village
- Location in Syria
- Coordinates: 34°53′2″N 36°20′45″E
- Country: Syria
- Governorate: Hama
- District: Masyaf District
- Subdistrict: Ayn Halaqim Nahiyah

Population (2004)
  - Total: 1,155
- Time zone: UTC+3 (AST)
- City Qrya Pcode: C3407

Barshin (Arabic: برشين) is a Syrian village located in Ayn Halaqim Nahiyah in Masyaf District, Hama. According to the Syria Central Bureau of Statistics (CBS), Barshin had a population of 1,155 in the 2004 census. Its inhabitants are predominantly Christians.

== Bibliography ==
- Robinson, E.; Smith, E. (1841). Biblical Researches in Palestine, Mount Sinai and Arabia Petraea: A Journal of Travels in the year 1838. Vol. 3. Boston: Crocker & Brewster.

== Links of Interest ==
- https://www.facebook.com/barsheencom/
