= Ain Halaqim =

Ain Halaqim عين حلاقيم Ein Halakim
- Town
- Location in Syria
- Coordinates: 34.940064°N 36.32376°E
- Country: Syria
- Governorate: Hama
- District: Masyaf
- Subdistrict: Ayn Halaqim

Population (2004)
  - Total: 1,216
- Time zone: UTC+3 (AST)

Ain Halaqim (Arabic: عين حلاقيم, also spelled Ein Halakim) is a village in northwestern Syria, administratively part of the Hama Governorate, located west of Hama. Nearby localities include al-Bayda and Masyaf to the north, al-Bayyadiyah to the northeast, Nisaf to the east, Kafr Kamrah to the southeast, Mashta al-Helu to the southwest, Ayn al-Shams to the west and Wadi al-Oyun to the northwest. According to the Syria Central Bureau of Statistics (CBS), Ain Halaqim had a population of 1,216 in the 2004 census. Its inhabitants are predominantly Christians.

== Name ==
The name Ain Halaqim is composed of two Arabic words: "Ain", which means spring of water and "Halaqim", the plural of "Houlkoum" meaning a tube or a pipe. Put together, the two words become "the spring of water with pipes". The village indeed has many water springs, the most important one is located in the heart of the village next to the new church and called the "big spring".

Traces of pipes installed on this spring have been discovered, and it is thought that those pipes were supplying an old kingdom located on the opposite side of the mountain; this might be the reason behind the village name "the water spring with pipes.

Another important water springs are spread inside and around the village, we can mention the one located next to the new elementary school in the eastern part of the village al-Hara al-Sharqiyah and in spite of its name the "small spring", it has a higher debit than the former one, another spring which is the most important one is located on a hill to the north of the village, and this one provides the village with its needs of water supply.

Another significant spring located on the western extremity of the village and called the "coffee spring" or "nabe3 el kahwe", its name came from the fact that a coffee-restaurant was built around it and started receiving clients since early 60s, thus the coffee gave its name to the spring and vice versa.

== Climate ==
Its considerable altitude (750-900 Meters) and special location give the village a cool and dry climate in the summer, making it one of the most important resorts in the country, especially for those who have high blood pressure or heart problems.

The special geographic position of Ain Halaqim is mostly due to the forests and the small mountain al-Nasoub, surrounding it from the west, while a long mountain Jabal al-Helou, faces it from the east. With an annual precipitation of about 900 mm, this position allowed the village to rank as one of the most rainy areas in Syria. .

An important river al-Sarout, runs along the valley between the village and Jabal al-Helou, irrigating the fields and the big variety of fruit farms producing a considerable amounts of fruits like apple, apricot, prune, pear, grapes and olive.
