= Awj Subdistrict =

Awj Subdistrict ناحية عوج
- Subdistrict (nahiyah)
- Location in Hama Governorate

- Location in Syria
- Coordinates: 34°54′44″N 36°24′17″E
- Country: Syria
- Governorate: Hama
- District: Masyaf District
- Capital: Awj

Population (2004)
  - Total: 33,344
- Time zone: UTC+2 (EET)
  - Summer (DST): UTC+3 (EEST)
- Nahya pcod: SY050402

Awj Subdistrict (Arabic: ناحية عوج) is a Syrian nahiyah (subdistrict) located in Masyaf District in Hama. According to the Syria Central Bureau of Statistics (CBS), Awj Subdistrict had a population of 33,344 in the 2004 census. As of July 2023, sub-district had a population of 47,573, of whom 8,212 were IDPs.
