= Suwayri =

Suwayri صويري
- Village
- Location in Syria
- Coordinates: 34°54′55″N 36°27′43″E
- Country: Syria
- Governorate: Homs
- District: Homs
- Subdistrict: Shin

Population (2004)
  - Total: 2,966
- Time zone: UTC+2 (EET)
  - Summer (DST): +3

Suwayri (Arabic: صويري, also spelled Suweireh or Swarey) is a village in western Syria located northwest of Homs in the Homs Governorate. Nearby towns include Shin to the northwest, al-Mahfurah to the north, Ghur Gharbiyah to the northeast, Qazhal to the east, Khirbet Tin Nur to the southeast, Khirbet al-Hamam to the south, Hadidah to the southwest and Mazinah to the west. According to the Syria Central Bureau of Statistics, Suwayri had a population of 2,966 in the 2004 census, making it the second largest locality in the Shin nahiyah ("subdistrict"). Its inhabitants are predominantly Alawites.

== Bibliography ==
- Robinson, E.; Smith, E. (1841). Biblical Researches in Palestine, Mount Sinai and Arabia Petraea: A Journal of Travels in the year 1838. Vol. 3. Boston: Crocker & Brewster.
