= Houla =

Region in Syria

Coordinates: 34°53′7″N 36°30′42″E

The Houla Region or Houla Plain (Arabic: الحولة Al-Ḥūla; Turkish: Hule) is an area consisting of three towns in the Homs Governorate of central Syria, It is a fertile agricultural plain situated between the Homs and Hama governorates, west of the Orontes River Valley and east of Jabal al-Helou. The region had a population of approximately 123,000 inhabitants according to the 2004 census The biggest town in the Houla region is called Kafr Laha had 20,041 inhabitants in 2004. The second largest town, Taldou, had 15,727 inhabitants in 2004 and is located in the outskirts of Houla. The third town, Tell Dahab had 12,055 inhabitants in 2004. The settlement is a predominantly Turkmen Sunni Muslim where Turkish language is widely spoken among its inhabitants. Houla is also surrounded by Alawite neighboring villages. Many of the inhabitants of the Houla cluster are of Turkmen descent.

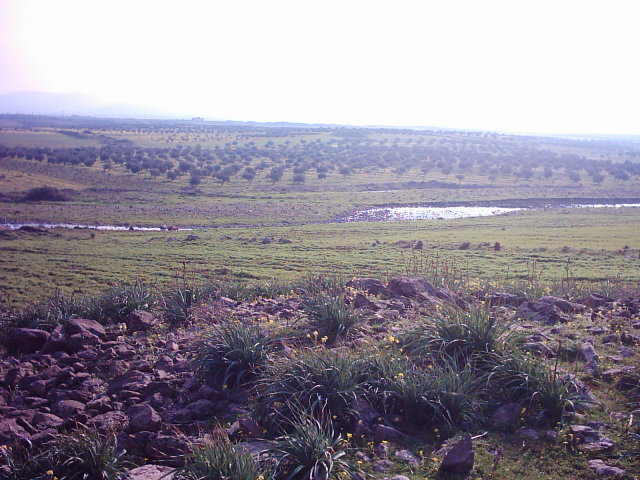
Olive cultivation in Houla Plain

Houla was described by 19th-century English scholar Eli Smith as a low-lying tract of land situated at the eastern slope of the Syrian Coastal Mountain Range. The 13th-century Syrian geographer Yaqut al-Hamawi visited al-Houla in 1226 during Ayyubid rule noting that the place belonged to Jund Hims ("military district of Homs").

== Towns and villages of the al-Houla Region ==
- Taldou: The principal town of the al-Houla region and its main commercial center. It serves as the administrative center of Taldou Subdistrict in Homs Governorate. Al-Houla Dam is located to its south.
- Kafr Laha: The largest town in the al-Houla region. It lies on the Homs–Masyaf road between Tal Dahab and Taldou, with a road connecting it to Tallaf. It is administratively part of Taldou Subdistrict in Homs Governorate.
- Tal Dahab: Located north of Kafr Laha and south of Aqrab, it is administratively part of Taldou Subdistrict in Homs Governorate.
- Al-Tayyibah al-Gharbiyah: Situated west of Kafr Laha near Jabal al-Hilu, it is administratively part of Taldou Subdistrict in Homs Governorate and is known for its olive cultivation.
- Al-Samlil: A Syrian Turkmen town located southeast of Taldou, administratively part of Taldou Subdistrict in Homs Governorate.
- Burj Qa'i: A Syrian Turkmen village west of Taldou, administratively part of Taldou Subdistrict in Homs Governorate.
- Hirbnafsah: Located east of the al-Houla Plain near Al-Rastan Dam, it is the administrative center of Hirbnafsah Subdistrict in Hama Governorate.
- Tallaf: A Syrian Turkmen town located very close to the Houla region, on the road between Kafr Laha and Tallaf, administratively part of Hirbnafsah Subdistrict in Hama Governorate
- Aqrab: A town known for its traditional carpet weaving, cheese production, and the cultivation of grapes and figs. It is administratively part of Hirbnafsah Subdistrict in Hama Governorate.

== The Houla massacre ==
The Houla massacre (Arabic: مجزرة الحولة) was a mass murder of civilians by Syrian government forces that took place on May 25, 2012, in the midst of the Syrian civil war, in the town of Taldou, in the Houla Region. According to the United Nations, 108 people were killed, including 34 women and 49 children.

On 29 April 2022, a water canal built by FAO was inaugurated in the region, which would bring water from Taldou dam to the agricultural lands there, after an eleven-year hiatus due to the civil war.

== Activities and inhabitants ==
The region is known for the cultivation of cereals, legumes, grapevines, olives, pomegranates, cotton, and vegetables. Livestock farming is also practiced, including the raising of cattle, sheep, poultry, and bees, as well as carp farming in Houla Dam.

== Bibliography ==
- Hartmann, Martin (2012). Reisebriefe aus Syrien (in German). Books on Demand. ISBN 978-3864448010.
- Smith, Eli; Robinson, Edward (1841). Biblical Researches in Palestine, Mount Sinai and Arabia Petraea: A Journal of Travels in the Year 1838. Vol. 3. Crocker and Brewster.
