= Al-Mahfurah =

Village in northern Syria

al-Mahfurah محفورة
- Village
- Location in Syria
- Coordinates: 34°48′51″N 36°27′7″E
- Country: Syria
- Governorate: Homs
- District: Homs
- Subdistrict: Shin

Population (2004)
  - Total: 1,845
- Time zone: UTC+3 (AST)

Al-Mahfurah (Arabic: محفورة) is a village in western Syria located northwest Homs in the Homs Governorate. Nearby towns include Shin to the southwest, Suwayri to the south, Sharqliyya to the northeast, al-Qabu to the north, Fahel to the northwest and Rabah to the west. According to the Syria Central Bureau of Statistics, al-Mahfurah had a population of 1,845 in the 2004 census. Its inhabitants are predominantly Alawites.

== Bibliography ==
- Robinson, E.; Smith, E. (1841). Biblical Researches in Palestine, Mount Sinai and Arabia Petraea: A Journal of Travels in the year 1838. Vol. 3. Boston: Crocker & Brewster.
