= Maryamin, Homs =

Maryamin مريمين Mariamin
- Village
- Location in Syria
- Coordinates: 34.88498°N 36.438816°E
- Country: Syria
- Governorate: Homs
- District: Homs
- Subdistrict: Taldou

Population (2018)
  - Total: ~12‘000
- Time zone: UTC+3 (AST)

Maryamin (Arabic: مريمين, also spelled Mariamin or Meriamen) is a village in central Syria, administratively part of the Homs Governorate starting from 2008 after being part of the Hama Governorate, located in Homs Gap southwest of Hama. Nearby localities include Aqrab, Nisaf and Baarin to the north, Kafr Kamrah and Mashta al-Helu to the west, Shin, al-Shinyah and al-Qabu to the south, and Taldou and Tell Dahab to the east. According to the Syria Central Bureau of Statistics, Maryamin had a population of 4,174 in the 2004 census. Its inhabitants are predominantly Alawites.

== History ==
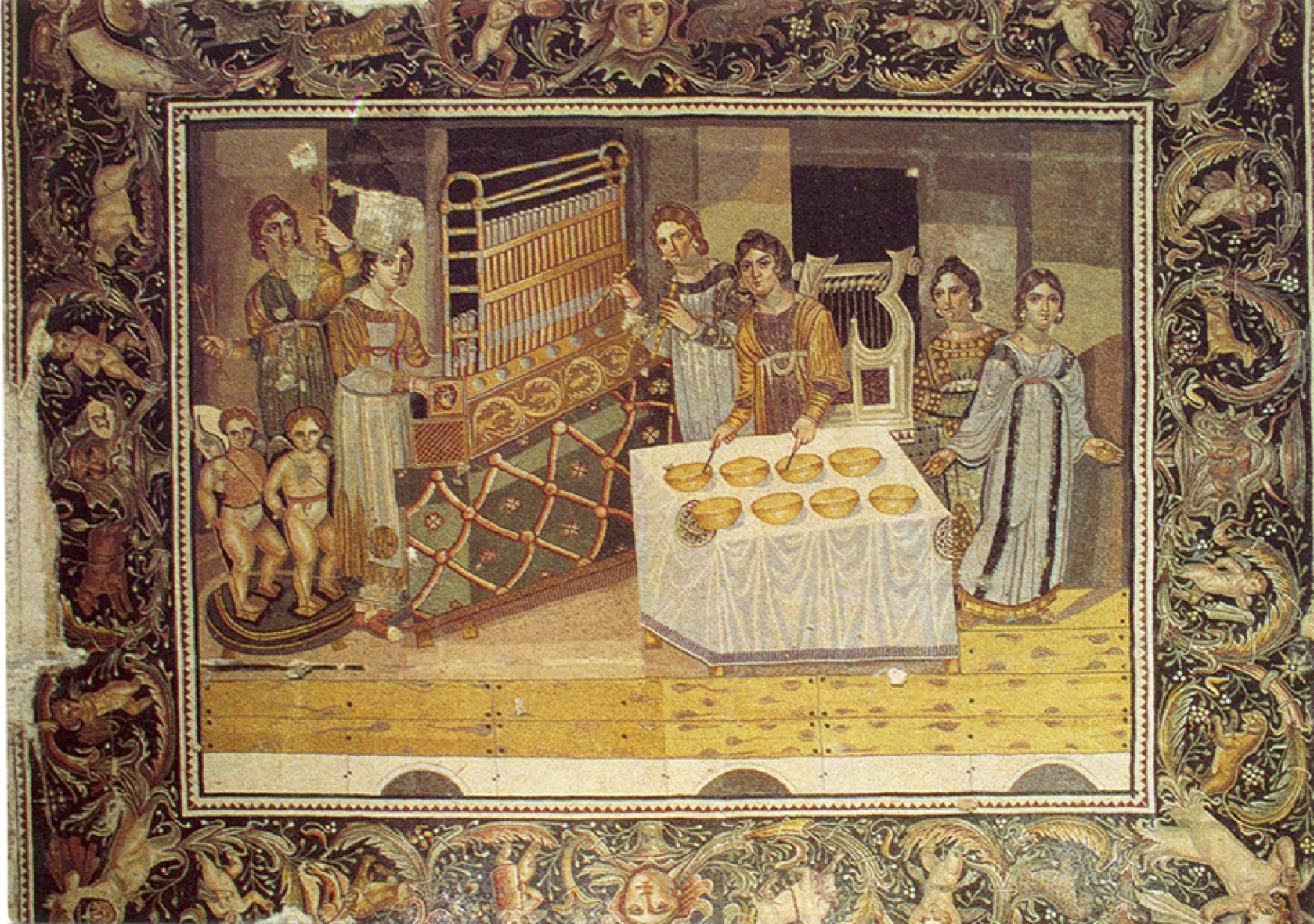
Late 4th century AD "Mosaic of the Musicians" with organ, aulos, oxyvaphi, and lyre from a Byzantine villa in Maryamin

Maryamin is believed to be located on the site of a town founded by Ramses II of the New Kingdom of Egypt.

Maryamin, or ancient "Mariamme", was mentioned by Pliny the Elder and in late Roman lists. The town likely served as the capital of the Mariamnitai tribe, but very little mention of the Roman town survives. The Roman Catholic Church still maintains a titular "Bishop of Mariamme".

An important late fourth-century mosaic from the Byzantine era was discovered in the ruins of a villa in Maryamin in 1960. The mosaic has an area of 20 square meters and depicts six female musicians playing instruments. The depiction is one of the few artifacts that give an indication on how the organ was used in antiquity. The other instruments seen in the mosaic are a pair of forked cymbals, a double aulos, an oxyvaphi (a percussion instrument, here consisting of eight yellow-coloured metal bowls played with two sticks), a kithara (a type of lyre), and cymbals. The mosaic is currently displayed at the regional museum of Hama.

The Syrian geographer Yaqut al-Hamawi noted that Maryamin was "one of the villages of Hims" when he visited in 1225, during Ayyubid rule.

During the first decade of Ottoman rule, Maryamin's population consisted of 22 households. By the end of the 16th century, the number had increased to 51 households, in addition to 20 bachelors (who were taxed separately).

In 1929, Maryamin and a number of other Alawite villages in the Masyaf district were transferred to the Alawite State after negotiations with their landlords. The villages' cultivated lands were distributed among the peasantry that worked them. In the early 1960s Maryamin had a population of 600 residents. It was a center for growing grape vines and contained a number of springs.

== Bibliography ==
- Beatti, Andrew (1996). Ring, Trudy (ed.). Hama, Syria. Vol. 4: Middle East and Africa. Fitzroy Dearborn Publishers. p. 318. ISBN 1-884964-03-6.
- Boulanger, Robert (1965). The Middle East, Lebanon, Syria, Jordan, Iraq, Iran. Hachette world guides. Hachette.
- Braun, Joachim (2002). Music in Ancient Israel/Palestine: Archaeological, Written, and Comparative Sources. Wm. B. Eerdmans Publishing. pp. 286–287. ISBN 0802844774.
- Bosworth, C. E. (1989). The Encyclopaedia of Islam: Fascicules 111-112 : Masrah Mawlid, Parts 111-112. BRILL. ISBN 9004092390.
- Butcher, Kevin (2003). Roman Syria: And the Near East. Getty Publications. ISBN 9780892367153.
- Kiilerich, Bente (2010). "The Mosaic of the Female Musicians from Mariamin". Acta Ad Archaeologiam et Artium Historiam Pertinentia. 22 (8 N.S): 87–107. doi:10.5617/acta.5756.
- Kiilerich, Bente (2017). "Mariamin Mosaic". The Eerdmans Encyclopedia of Early Christian Art and Archaeology. Vol. 2. Grand Rapids, Michigan. p. 107.
- Le Strange, G. (1890). Palestine Under the Moslems: A Description of Syria and the Holy Land from A.D. 650 to 1500. Committee of the Palestine Exploration Fund.
- Robinson, E.; Smith, E. (1841). Biblical Researches in Palestine, Mount Sinai and Arabia Petraea: A Journal of Travels in the year 1838. Vol. 3. Boston: Crocker & Brewster.
