= Muqlus =

Muqlus مقلس Mqlos
- Village
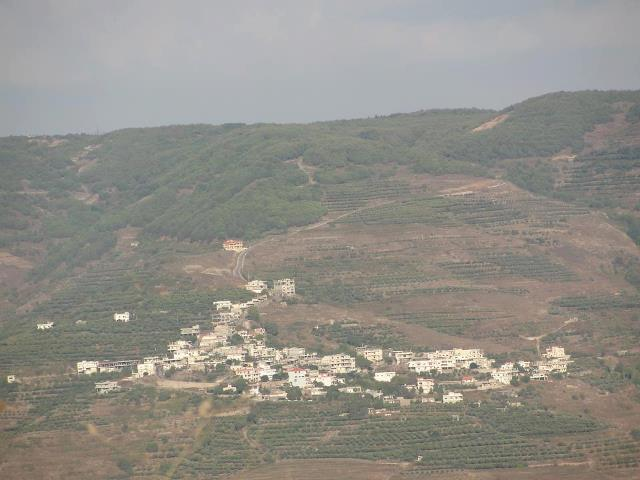
- View of Muklous from a distance
- Nicknames: Mqlos, Muklous or Mukloss
- Location in Syria
- Coordinates: 34°49′49″N 36°20′52″E
- Country: Syria
- Governorate: Homs
- District: Talkalakh
- Subdistrict: Hawash
- Settled: 1st century CE
- Elevation: 800 m (2,600 ft)

Population (2004)
  - Total: 375
- Time zone: UTC+3 (EET)
  - Summer (DST): UTC+2 (EEST)

Muqlus or Mqlos (Arabic: مقلس, also spelled Mqlos, Mukloss, Muklous or Muklis) is a village in western Syria, administratively belonging to the governorate of Homs.

Nearby localities include Hasour to the north, al-Nasirah to the southwest, Mazinah to the south, Shin to the southeast, Rabah to the east and Fahel to the northeast. It is located about 40 kilometers west of Homs.

According to the Syria Central Bureau of Statistics (CBS), Muklous had a population of 375 in the 2004 census. The village has a Greek Orthodox Church.

== Etymology ==
The name Muklous is translated as "eye of the lion".

== Demographics ==
Muklous had a population of 375 in 2004. Its inhabitants are predominantly Greek Orthodox Christians and Alawites. Expatriates from the village have settled in the Americas and Europe as well as in Lebanon and the Persian Gulf region.

== Economy ==
Muklous' industry is mainly agriculture, including apples, olives, figs, grapes, plums, peaches and pomegranates.

== Bibliography ==
- Robinson, E.; Smith, E. (1841). Biblical Researches in Palestine, Mount Sinai and Arabia Petraea: A Journal of Travels in the year 1838. Vol. 3. Boston: Crocker & Brewster.
