= Muranah =

Muranah مرانة Murrany
- Village
- Location in Syria
- Coordinates: 34°47′59″N 36°24′54″E
- Country: Syria
- Governorate: Homs
- District: Homs
- Subdistrict: Shin

Population (2004)
  - Total: 395
- Time zone: UTC+3 (AST)

Muranah (Arabic: مرانة, also spelled Murrany) is a village in northern Syria located northwest of Homs in the Homs Governorate. According to the Syria Central Bureau of Statistics, Muranah had a population of 395 in the 2004 census. Its inhabitants are predominantly Alawites, Greek Orthodox Christians and Maronites.

== Bibliography ==
- Robinson, E.; Smith, E. (1841). Biblical Researches in Palestine, Mount Sinai and Arabia Petraea: A Journal of Travels in the year 1838. Vol. 3. Boston: Crocker & Brewster.
