= Al-Taybah al-Gharbiyah =

Al-Taybah al-Gharbiyah الطيبة الغربية West Teiba
- Village
- Location in Syria
- Coordinates: 34°52′32″N 36°27′58″E
- Country: Syria
- Governorate: Homs
- District: Homs
- Subdistrict: Taldou

Population (2004)
  - Total: 4,086
- Time zone: UTC+2 (EET)
  - Summer (DST): +3

Al-Taybah al-Gharbiyah (Arabic: الطيبة الغربية, also spelled Teiba or Tayibeh al-Gharbiyeh) is a town in central Syria, administratively part of the Homs Governorate, northwest of Homs. Nearby localities include al-Shinyah to the southwest, al-Qabu to the south, Sharqliyya to the southeast, Taldou to the east, Kafr Laha and Tell Dahab to the northeast, Qarmas and Aqrab to the north, Qasraya to the northwest and Khunayzir to the west. According to the Central Bureau of Statistics (CBS), al-Taybah al-Gharbiyah had a population of 4,086 in the 2004 census. Its inhabitants today are predominantly Sunni Muslims.

== History ==
In 1829, during Ottoman rule, the village consisted of 33 feddans and paid 3,190 qirsh in annual tax revenues. It was exempted from most of the taxation imposed on the other villages in the prosperous region southwest of Hama as the villaged belonged to the waqf (endowment) of the Khalid ibn al-Walid Mosque in Homs. In 1838 al-Taybah al-Gharbiyah's inhabitants were reported to be Alawites by English scholar Eli Smith.

== Bibliography ==
- Douwes, Dick (2000). The Ottomans in Syria: a history of justice and oppression. I.B. Tauris. ISBN 1860640311.
- Robinson, E.; Smith, E. (1841). Biblical Researches in Palestine, Mount Sinai and Arabia Petraea: A Journal of Travels in the year 1838. Vol. 3. Boston: Crocker & Brewster.
