= Jablaya =

Jablaya جبلايا
- Village
- Location in Syria
- Coordinates: 34°47′7″N 36°23′32″E
- Country: Syria
- Governorate: Homs
- District: Homs
- Subdistrict: Shin

Population (2004)
  - Total: 618
- Time zone: UTC+3 (AST)

Jablaya (Arabic: جبلايا) is a village in northern Syria located northwest of Homs in the Homs Governorate. According to the Syria Central Bureau of Statistics, Jablaya had a population of 618 in the 2004 census. Its inhabitants are predominantly Alawites.

== Bibliography ==
- Robinson, E.; Smith, E. (1841). Biblical Researches in Palestine, Mount Sinai and Arabia Petraea: A Journal of Travels in the year 1838. Vol. 3. Boston: Crocker & Brewster.
