= Rabah, Syria =

Rabah رباح
- Village
- Location in Syria
- Coordinates: 34°49′0″N 36°23′0″E
- Country: Syria
- Governorate: Homs
- District: Homs
- Subdistrict: al-Qabu
- Elevation: 763 m (2,503 ft)

Population (2004)
  - Total: 2,341
- Time zone: UTC+3 (AST)

Rabah (Arabic: رباح) is a village in northwestern Syria, administratively part of the Homs Governorate, located west of the city of Homs. Nearby localities include Muklous to the west, Hawash and Zweitina to the southwest, Shin to the southeast, al-Mahfurah to the east, al-Qabu, Syria to the northeast and Fahel to the north. According to the Syria Central Bureau of Statistics (CBS), Rabah had a population of 2,341 in 2004. Its inhabitants are predominantly Greek Orthodox Christians.

== Bibliography ==
- Robinson, E.; Smith, E. (1841). Biblical Researches in Palestine, Mount Sinai and Arabia Petraea: A Journal of Travels in the year 1838. Vol. 3. Boston: Crocker & Brewster.
