= Sufr =

Sufr صفر Suqur Abu Wardah
- Village
- Location in Syria
- Coordinates: 34°47′5″N 36°28′31″E
- Country: Syria
- Governorate: Homs
- District: Homs
- Subdistrict: Shin

Population (2004)
  - Total: 712
- Time zone: UTC+2 (EET)
  - Summer (DST): +3

Sufr (Arabic: صفر, also spelled Suffur, also known as Suqur Abu Wardah) is a village in northern Syria located northwest of Homs in the Homs Governorate. According to the Syria Central Bureau of Statistics, Sufr had a population of 712 in the 2004 census. Its inhabitants are predominantly Alawites.

== Bibliography ==
- Robinson, E.; Smith, E. (1841). Biblical Researches in Palestine, Mount Sinai and Arabia Petraea: A Journal of Travels in the year 1838. Vol. 3. Boston: Crocker & Brewster.
