= Ghawr Gharbiyah =

Ghur Gharbiyah غور غربية Ghor Gharbiya
- Village
- Location in Syria
- Coordinates: 34°50′45″N 36°32′47″E
- Country: Syria
- Governorate: Homs
- District: Homs
- Subdistrict: Taldou

Population (2004)
  - Total: 4,016
- Time zone: UTC+3 (AST)

Ghawr Gharbiyah (Arabic: غور غربية, also spelled Ghor Gharbiya or Ghouri) is a town in central Syria, administratively part of the Homs Governorate, northwest of Homs. Nearby localities include Qazhal to the southeast, Akrad Dayasinah to the east, Burj Qa'i to the northeast, Taldou and Kafr Laha to the northwest and Sharqliyya and al-Qabu to the west. According to the Central Bureau of Statistics (CBS), Ghawr Gharbiyah had a population of 4,016 in the 2004 census. Its inhabitants are predominantly Shia Muslims.

In 1829, during Ottoman rule, the village consisted of 30 feddans and paid 3,080 qirsh in annual tax revenues. In 1838 Ghawr Gharbiyah was classified as a Sunni Muslim village.

== Bibliography ==
- Douwes, Dick (2000). The Ottomans in Syria: a history of justice and oppression. I.B. Tauris. ISBN 1860640311.
- Robinson, E.; Smith, E. (1841). Biblical Researches in Palestine, Mount Sinai and Arabia Petraea: A Journal of Travels in the year 1838. Vol. 3. Boston: Crocker & Brewster.
