= Khirbet Tin Mahmoud =

Khirbet al-Tin Mahmoud خربة تين محمود Khirbet at-Teen Mahmud
- Location in Syria
- Coordinates: 34°46′26″N 36°34′6″E
- Country: Syria
- Governorate: Homs Governorate
- District: Homs District
- Nahiya: Khirbet Tin Nur

Population (2004)
  - Total: 866
- Time zone: UTC+3 (AST)

Khirbet al-Tin Mahmoud (Arabic: خربة تين محمود, also spelled Khirbet at-Teen Mahmud) is a village in western Syria, administratively part of the Homs Governorate, east of Homs. Nearby localities include Khirbet al-Sawda to the northeast, al-Ghor al-Gharbiya to the north, Shin to the west and Khirbet Tin Nur to the south. According to the Central Bureau of Statistics (CBS), Khirbet al-Tin Mahmoud had a population of 866 in the 2004 census.
