= Ayn Al-Fawwar =

Ayn Al-Fawwar عين الفوار
- Village
- Location in Syria
- Coordinates: 34°48′13″N 36°23′7″E
- Country: Syria
- Governorate: Homs
- District: Homs
- Subdistrict: Shin

Population (2004)
  - Total: 623
- Time zone: UTC+3 (AST)

Ayn Al-Fawwar (Arabic: عين الفوار), previously known as Ayn al-Qutt, is a village in Syria in the Homs District, Homs Governorate. According to the Syria Central Bureau of Statistics, Ayn Al-Fawwar had a population of 623 in the 2004 census.
