= Khirbet al-Sawda, Homs =

Khirbet al-Sawda خربة السودا Khirbet as-Soda
- Location in Syria
- Coordinates: 34°46′59″N 36°37′23″E
- Country: Syria
- Governorate: Homs Governorate
- District: Homs District
- Nahiya: Khirbet Tin Nur

Population (2004)
  - Total: 507
- Time zone: UTC+3 (AST)

Khirbet al-Sawda (Arabic: خربة السودا, also spelled Khirbet al-Soda) is a village in western Syria, administratively part of the Homs Governorate, northwest of Homs. Nearby towns include Khirbet al-Tin Mahmud to the southwest, Qazhal to the south and Dar al-Kabera to the northeast. According to the Central Bureau of Statistics (CBS), Khirbet al-Sawda had a population of 507 in the 2004 census. It is largely populated by Syrian Turkmens.
