= Al-Dar al-Kabirah =

Al-Dar al-Kabirah الدار الكبيرة
- Village
- Location in Syria
- Coordinates: 34°47′10.73″N 36°40′57.58″E
- Country: Syria
- Governorate: Homs Governorate
- District: Homs District
- Nahiyah: Homs

Population (2004)
  - Total: 7,280
- Time zone: UTC+3 (AST)

Al-Dar al-Kabirah (Arabic: الدار الكبيرة, romanized: Al-Dār al-Kabīrāh, also spelled Dar al-Kabera) is a town in central Syria, administratively part of the Homs Governorate, forming a northwestern suburb of Homs. Nearby localities include Khirbet al-Sawda to the west and al-Ghantu and Teir Maalah to the northeast. According to the Central Bureau of Statistics (CBS), al-Dar al-Kabirah had a population of 7,280 in the 2004 census. A significant portion of the inhabitants are Turkmens.
