= Samalil =

al-Sam'alil السمعليل
- Village
- Location in Syria
- Coordinates: 34°50′13″N 36°34′6″E
- Country: Syria
- Governorate: Homs
- District: Homs
- Subdistrict: Taldou

Population (2004)
  - Total: 1,017
- Time zone: UTC+3 (EET)
  - Summer (DST): UTC+2 (EEST)

Sam'alil (Arabic: السمعليل, romanized: al-Sam'ālīl) is a village in northern Syria, administratively part of the Homs District, located north of Homs. According to the Syria Central Bureau of Statistics (CBS), Sam'alil had a population of 1,017 in the 2004 census. Its inhabitants are predominantly Sunni Muslims of Turkmen descent.

== History ==
According to Ottoman Defter records, the village had 12 households in 1526. By 1594, its population had increased to 39 households in addition to 20 bachelors.
