= Qarmas =

Qarmas قرمص Qurmus
- Municipality
- Location in Syria
- Coordinates: 34.909725°N 36.455040°E
- Country: Syria
- Governorate: Hama
- District: Masyaf
- Subdistrict: Awj

Population (2004)
  - Total: 5,331
- Time zone: UTC+3 (AST)

Qarmas (Arabic: قرمص, also spelled Qurmus) is a village in northern Syria, administratively part of the Hama Governorate, located 46 kilometers (29 mi) southwest of Hama. Nearby localities include Aqrab to the north, Tell Dahab to the east, Kafr Laha to the southeast, al-Taybah al-Gharbiyah to the south, Maryamin to the southwest, Awj and Kafr Kamrah to the west and Baarin to the northwest.

According to the Syria Central Bureau of Statistics, Qarmas had a population of 5,331 in the 2004 census. Its inhabitants are predominantly Alawites. Most of the village's lands are planted with olive and fig groves and vineyards, while near the village is a small fir and oak forest. As of 2010, most of the working inhabitants were engaged in agriculture and livestock. Qarmas has a primary and secondary school.

== History ==
In an Ottoman government record from 1818 Qarmas was listed as part of the village of Maryamin in the mainly Alawite 'Jabal Gharbi' fiscal district (muqata'a) of Hama Sanjak and paid 4,580 qirsh in taxes. In 1838 it was recorded as an Alawite village.

In the late 19th or early 20th centuries, the inhabitants of Qarmas sold or 'ceded' their lands to the urban notables of Hama, turning its Alawite small landowners into tenant farmers. By the early 1930s, the village was owned by the Barazi family of Hama.

In March 2007, the Qarmas Municipality was established to administer Qarmas and neighboring Qasraya.

== Bibliography ==
- Comité de l'Asie française (April 1933). "Notes sur la propriété foncière dans le Syrie centrale (Notes on Landownership in Central Syria)". Bulletin du Comité de l'Asie française (in French). 33 (309). Comité de l'Asie française: 130–136.
- Douwes, Dick (2000). The Ottomans in Syria: A History of Justice and Oppression. I.B. Tauris. ISBN 1860640311.
- Smith, Eli; Robinson, Edward (1841). Biblical Researches in Palestine, Mount Sinai and Arabia Petraea: A Journal of Travels in the Year 1838. Vol. 3. Crocker and Brewster.
