= Qaz al-Khass =

Qaz al-Khass قز الخاص
- Village
- Al-Rabyah
- Location in Syria
- Coordinates: 34°41′24″N 36°23′31″E
- Country: Syria
- Governorate: Homs
- District: Talkalakh
- Subdistrict: Hadidah

Population (2004)
  - Total: 543
- Time zone: UTC+2 (EET)
  - Summer (DST): +3

Qaz al-Khass (Arabic: قز الخاص, also spelled Qazl Khass or Kazz el-Khass; also known as al-Rabyah) is a village in northern Syria located northwest of Homs in the Homs Governorate. According to the Syria Central Bureau of Statistics, Qaz al-Khass had a population of 543 in the 2004 census. Its inhabitants are predominantly Alawites.

== Bibliography ==
- Robinson, E.; Smith, E. (1841). Biblical Researches in Palestine, Mount Sinai and Arabia Petraea: A Journal of Travels in the year 1838. Vol. 3. Boston: Crocker & Brewster.
