= Panagia Gorgoepikoos =

Panagia Gorgoepikoos (Greek: Παναγία Γοργοεπήκοος, lit. 'Panagia Who Grants Requests Quickly') can refer to:

- Little Metropolis, Byzantine church in central Athens, Greece
- Panagia Gorgoepikoos Monastery, Mandra, Attica, Greece
- Panagia Gorgoepikoos Church in Docheiariou monastery, Mount Athos, Greece
