= Al-Shinyah =

al-Shinyah الشنية al-Shiniyeh
- Village
- Location in Syria
- Coordinates: 34°51′29″N 36°27′6″E
- Country: Syria
- Governorate: Homs
- District: Homs
- Subdistrict: al-Qabu

Population (2004)
  - Total: 2,058
- Time zone: UTC+3 (EET)
  - Summer (DST): UTC+2 (EEST)

Al-Shinyah (Arabic: الشنية, also spelled al-Shiniyeh) is a village in central Syria, administratively part of the Homs Governorate, located northwest of Homs. Nearby localities include Fahel to the southwest, al-Qabu to the south, Sharqliyya to the southeast, Taldou and al-Taybah al-Gharbiyah to the northeast and Maryamin to the northwest. According to the Syria Central Bureau of Statistics (CBS), al-Shinyah had a population of 2,058 in the 2004 census. Its inhabitants are predominantly Alawites.

== Bibliography ==
- Robinson, E.; Smith, E. (1841). Biblical Researches in Palestine, Mount Sinai and Arabia Petraea: A Journal of Travels in the year 1838. Vol. 3. Boston: Crocker & Brewster.
