= Sharqliyya =

Sharqliyya شرقلية Sharqlieh
- Village
- Location in Syria
- Coordinates: 34°50′9″N 36°30′39″E
- Country: Syria
- Governorate: Homs
- District: Homs
- Subdistrict: al-Qabu

Population (2004)
  - Total: 1,347
- Time zone: UTC+3 (EET)
  - Summer (DST): UTC+2 (EEST)

Sharqliyya (Arabic: شرقلية, also spelled Sharqlieh) is a village in central Syria, administratively part of the Homs Governorate, located northwest of Homs. Nearby localities include al-Qabu and al-Shinyah to the west, al-Taybah al-Gharbiyah to the northwest, Taldou to the northeast and Ghur Gharbiyah to the east.

According to the Central Bureau of Statistics (CBS), Sharqliyya had a population of 1,362 in the 2004 census. Its current inhabitants are predominantly Alawites and agriculture is the chief source of income for the village.

== History ==
During the late Ottoman era, in 1829, Sharqliyya was a Turkmen village in the Sanjak of Hama, consisting of 12 feddans. In 1838 Sharqliyya's inhabitants were reported to be Muslims by British scholar Eli Smith.

== Bibliography ==
- Batatu, H. (1999). Syria's Peasantry, the Descendants of Its Lesser Rural Notables, and Their Politics. Princeton University Press. ISBN 0691002541.
- Douwes, Dick (2000). The Ottomans in Syria: a history of justice and oppression. I.B. Tauris. ISBN 1860640311.
- Robinson, E.; Smith, E. (1841). Biblical Researches in Palestine, Mount Sinai and Arabia Petraea: A Journal of Travels in the year 1838. Vol. 3. Boston: Crocker & Brewster.
