= Qazhal =

Qazhal قزحل Gazzal, Kazhil
- Location in Syria
- Coordinates: 34°45′12″N 36°37′34″E
- Country: Syria
- Governorate: Homs
- District: Homs
- Subdistrict: Khirbet Tin Nur

Population (2004)
  - Total: 2,271
- Time zone: UTC+3 (AST)

Qazhal (Arabic: قزحل, also spelled Gazzal or Kazhil) is a village in western Syria, administratively part of the Homs Governorate, just west of Homs. Nearby localities include the al-Waer suburb of Homs to the east, Khirbet al-Sawda to the north, Khirbet Tin Mahmoud to the northwest and Khirbet Tin Nur to the southwest. According to the Central Bureau of Statistics (CBS), Qazhal had a population of 2,271 in the 2004 census. Its inhabitants are predominantly Turkmens.
