= Fahil =

Fahil فاحل
- Village
- Location in Syria
- Coordinates: 34°50′49″N 36°24′25″E
- Country: Syria
- Governorate: Homs
- District: Homs
- Subdistrict: al-Qabu
- Elevation: 701 m (2,300 ft)

Population (2004)
  - Total: 5,775
- Time zone: UTC+3 (AST)

Fahil (Arabic: فاحل) is a town in central Syria, administratively part of the Homs Governorate, located 45 kilometers (28 mi) northwest of Homs. Fahel lies in a long valley surrounded by mountains in the basaltic region of Jabal al-Helou with elevations ranging from 850–1,100 meters (2,790–3,610 ft) above sea level. On the village's eastern end, where the mountains slope lower, lies the road connecting it with Homs. Nearby localities include Taldou and Kafr Laha to the northeast and al-Qabu to the west. According to the Central Bureau of Statistics (CBS), Fahil had a population of 5,775 in the 2004 census.

Fahel was relatively self-sufficient in basic services, including primary and secondary education, healthcare, telephone and postal offices. The village is well known for growing apples, which cover 5,580 dunams and produce an average annual of 20,000 tons. Olives are the next major crop, followed by grapes and figs. Around 2008, the village mayor Badr Ali noted the village had recently seen increased modernization, including the use of tractors for agricultural transport, and the spread of cement construction, replacing older homes made of brick, mud and stone.

== History ==
According to the Ottoman Defter records of 1526 (a decade after their conquest of Syria), the village of Fahil consisted of 12 households. By 1594, the population had increased to 56 households. In 1838, it was recorded as an Alawite and Greek Orthodox Christian-populated village.

== Syrian Civil War ==
On 24 January 2025, shortly after the fall of the Assad regime. At least 16 people were killed in the village by gunmen with reported links to the new Syrian government. The SOHR confirmed the deaths of 16 people. 58 other people were also arrested. Some were former officers of the Assad regime.

== Bibliography ==
- Robinson, E.; Smith, E. (1841). Biblical Researches in Palestine, Mount Sinai and Arabia Petraea: A Journal of Travels in the year 1838. Vol. 3. Boston: Crocker & Brewster.
