= Nasser al-Muhaimid =

Syrian politician

- ناصر محمد علي المحيميد

Member of the People's Assembly
- Incumbent
- Assumed office 6 October 2025
- Constituency: Homs

Personal details
- Born: 1980 (age 45–46) Homs, Syria
- Party: Independent

Nasser al-Muhaimid (Arabic: ناصر محمد علي المحيميد; born 1978) is a Syrian politician and former rebel fighter who is currently a member of the People's Assembly, representing Homs District.

== Biography ==
Born in Homs in 1980. He founded the Baba Amr Revolutionaries Battalion in April 2012 and was among the founders of the Fourth Corps in northern Homs in 2018 within the Syrian National Army. After displacement to Rural Aleppo, he joined the Second Corps and became commander of the 242nd Brigade – 24th Division.

In the 2025 Syrian parliamentary election, Nasser was elected as one of the members of the People's Assembly for the Homs District.
