= Musa al-Hulah =

Musa al-Hulah موسى الحوله
- Village
- Location in Syria
- Coordinates: 34°57′50″N 36°33′34″E
- Country: Syria
- Governorate: Hama
- District: Hama
- Subdistrict: Hirbnafsah

Population (2004)
  - Total: 1,781
- Time zone: UTC+3 (AST)
- City Qrya Pcode: C3066

Musa al-Hulah (Arabic: موسى الحوله, romanized: Mūsā al-Hūla, also spelled as Mousa al-Houla) is a Syrian village located in the Hirbnafsah Subdistrict of the Hama District, located 30 kilometers southwest of Hama. According to the Syria Central Bureau of Statistics (CBS), Musa al-Hulah had a population of 1,781 in the 2004 census. A municipality was established to administer the village and nearby Jadrin in 2004, after the two villages were separated from the Talaf municipality.
