= Tell Dahab =

Tell Dahab تل ذهب Tal Dhahab
- Village
- Location in Syria
- Coordinates: 34°51′29″N 36°27′6″E
- Country: Syria
- Governorate: Homs
- District: Homs
- Subdistrict: Taldou

Population (2004)
  - Total: 12,055
- Time zone: UTC+3 (EET)
  - Summer (DST): UTC+2 (EEST)

Tell Dahab (Arabic: تل ذهب, also spelled Tal Dhahab) is a village in central Syria, administratively part of the Homs Governorate, located northwest of Homs. Nearby localities include Taldou and Kafr Laha, Maryamin and al-Taybah al-Gharbiyah to the southwest, Awj to the west, Aqrab to the northwest, Bisin to the north and Talaf to the east. According to the Syria Central Bureau of Statistics (CBS), Tell Dahab had a population of 12,055 in the 2004 census. Its inhabitants are predominantly Sunni Muslims.

An ancient church dedicated to Saints Sergius and Bacchus, built during the Byzantine era, is located in Tell Dahab. During the late Ottoman era, in 1829, Tell Dahab consisted of 65 feddans and paid annual taxes of 6,930 qirsh. It was a well-established village by the 19th-century and during the brief Egyptian, the local agha ("military commander") Abdullah Agha Tayfur invested in Tell Dahab.

== Bibliography ==
- Douwes, Dick (2000). The Ottomans in Syria: a history of justice and oppression. I.B. Tauris. ISBN 1860640311.
- O'Neill, Dennis (2010). Passionate Holiness: Marginalized Christian Devotions for Distinctive Peoples. Trafford Publishing. ISBN 978-1426925054.
- Smith, Eli; Robinson, Edward (1841). Biblical Researches in Palestine, Mount Sinai and Arabia Petraea: A Journal of Travels in the Year 1838. Vol. 3. Crocker and Brewster.
