= Abdullah Ghannoum =

Syrian Islamic scholar and politician (born 1978)

- عبد الله غنوم

Member of the People's Assembly
- Incumbent
- Assumed office 5 October 2025
- Constituency: Homs

Personal details
- Born: Abdullah Muhammad Khaled Ghannoum; 1978 (age 47–48) Homs, Syria
- Party: Independent
- Education: Al-Azhar University; Damascus University

Abdullah Muhammad Khaled Ghannoum (Arabic: عبد الله محمد خالد غنوم; born 1978) is a Syrian Islamic scholar, activist and politician who has served as a member of the People's Assembly for the constituency of Homs since October 2025. Before entering parliament, he was involved in humanitarian and educational initiatives in opposition-held Syria and served as chairman of the Al-Bunyan Humanitarian Association.

== Biography ==
Ghannoum was born in Homs in 1978. He received his early religious education at the Khalid ibn al-Walid Mosque Scientific Institute in his native city before continuing his studies at the al-Fath Islamic Institute in Damascus. He subsequently travelled to Egypt, where he studied at the Faculty of Sharia at Al-Azhar University in Cairo, one of the leading centres of Sunni Islamic learning in the Arab world. Alongside his religious studies, Ghannoum pursued higher education in Syria and studied education at Damascus University. In 2009, he obtained a master's degree in Usul al-Fiqh (Principles of Islamic Jurisprudence).

After the outbreak of the Syrian revolution in 2011 and the subsequent civil war, Ghannoum became involved in humanitarian relief and educational initiatives in opposition-held areas of Syria. He participated in the establishment of several charitable and educational organizations, including the Al-Bunyan Humanitarian Association, the Rayhan Association, and the Basair Educational Foundation. During the conflict, he also contributed to the establishment of the Homs Sharia Council, which sought to coordinate religious and civil affairs in opposition-controlled areas of the governorate.

Following the fall of the Assad regime in December 2024 and the subsequent political transition, Ghannoum entered formal politics as an independent candidate in Homs Governorate. In the 2025 parliamentary election, he was elected to the People's Assembly representing the constituency of Homs in October 2025.
