= Khirbet al-Hamam =

Khirbet al-Hamam خربة الحمام
- Village
- Location in Syria
- Coordinates: 34°42′1″N 36°28′54″E
- Country: Syria
- Governorate: Homs
- District: Homs
- Subdistrict: Khirbet Tin Nur

Population (2004)
  - Total: 4,817
- Time zone: UTC+3 (AST)
- City Qrya Pcode: C2570

Khirbet al-Hamam (Arabic: خربة الحمام) is a village in Syria located in the Homs District, Homs Governorate. According to the Syria Central Bureau of Statistics, Khirbet al-Hamam had a population of 4,817 in the 2004 census. It is an Alawite village.
