= Nour al-Jandali =

Syrian politician

- نور الجندلي

Member of the People's Assembly
- Incumbent
- Assumed office 6 October 2025
- Constituency: Homs

Personal details
- Born: 1978 (age 47–48) Homs, Syria
- Party: Independent
- Website: https://www.nour-jandali.com/f7fa025e

Nour Muhammad Mu'ayyad Jandali (Arabic: نور الجندلي; born 1978) is a Syrian politician, political and rights activist, teacher and newspaper columnist who is currently a member of the People's Assembly, representing Homs District. Jandali is a supporter of a campaign to give Syrian citizenship to children with Syrian mothers and fathers, as opposed to paternal citizenship only.

== Election ==
In the 2025 Syrian parliamentary election, Jandali was elected as one of the members of the People's Assembly for the Homs District.
