= Little Metropolis =

Byzantine church in Athens, Greece

Coordinates: 37°58′30.02″N 23°43′48.06″E

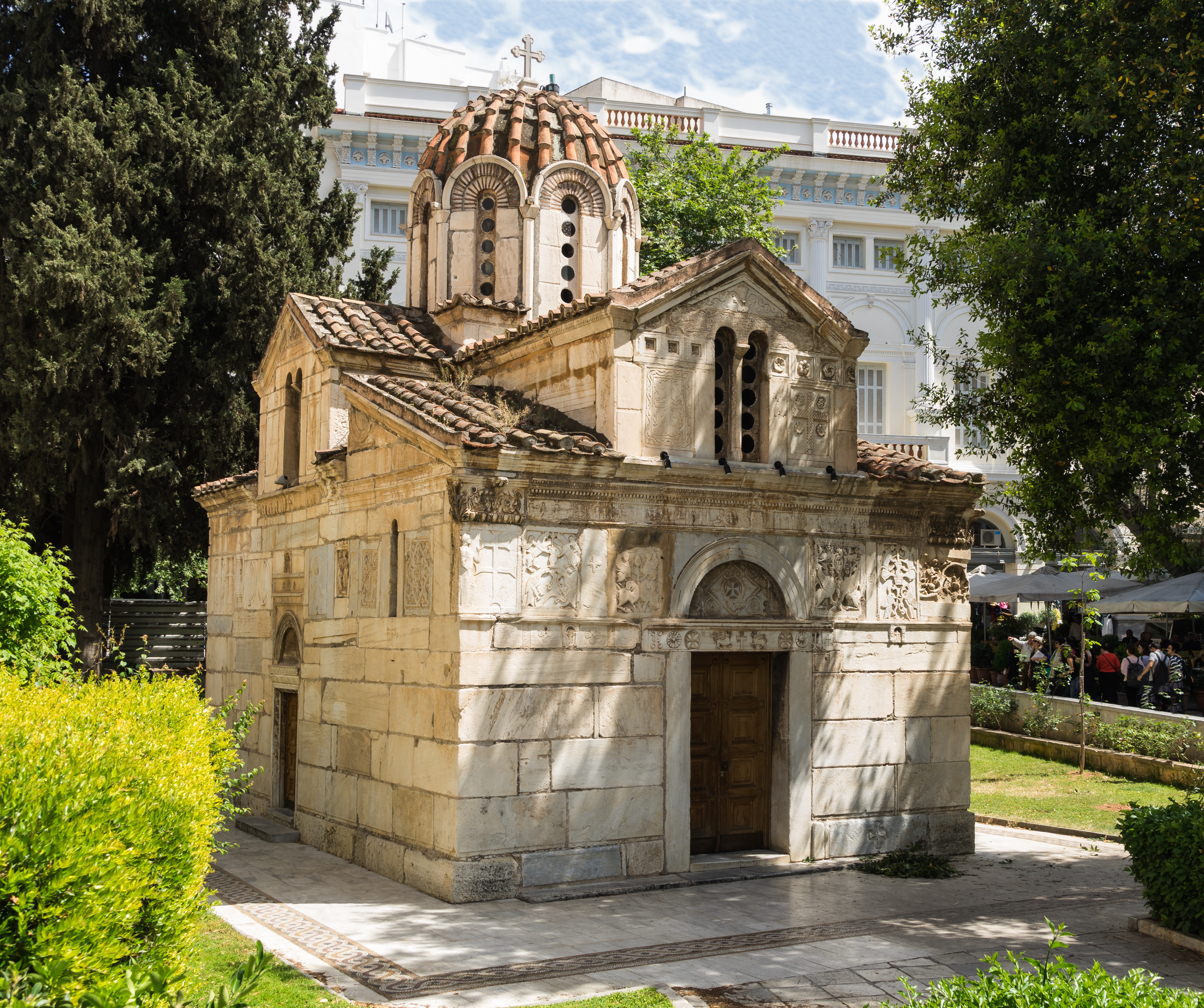
Exterior of the church in 2016

The Little Metropolis (Greek: Μικρή Μητρόπολη, romanized: Mikrí Mitrópoli), formally the Church of St. Eleutherius (Greek: Άγιος Ελευθέριος, romanized: Áyios Elefthérios) or Panagia Gorgoepikoos (Greek: Παναγία Γοργοεπήκοος, romanized: Panayía Gorgoepíkoos, lit. 'Panagia Who Grants Requests Quickly'), is a Byzantine church located at the Mitropoleos Square, next to the Metropolitan Cathedral of Athens (the "Great Metropolis").

== History and dating ==
The church is built on top of the ruins of an ancient temple dedicated to the goddess Eileithyia. Various dates for its construction have been proposed in the past, from the 9th century under Empress Irene of Athens to the 13th century. Until recently, the common view among scholars, especially in Greece, ascribed it to the tenure of Michael Choniates as Metropolitan of Athens, at the turn of the 13th century. However, the Little Metropolis differs considerably from other Byzantine churches of the same period in Athens, and indeed elsewhere; although it follows the typical cross-in-square style, it is, uniquely, almost entirely built of reused spolia from earlier buildings, ranging from Classical Antiquity to the 12th or even 13th centuries, thus precluding an earlier date of construction. The historian Bente Kiilerich further pointed out that during his visit to Athens in 1436, the antiquarian Cyriacus of Ancona mentions one of the inscriptions from the spolia of the church as lying in the Ancient Agora of Athens, i.e., far from its present location. This suggests that the church was built after 1436. Kiilerich suggested an early Ottoman-era date for the church, perhaps connected with the takeover of the city's old cathedral—the Theotokos Atheniotissa in the Parthenon—by the Turks and its conversion into a mosque.

Originally dedicated to the Panagia Gorgoepikoos after a miraculous icon of the Virgin Mary housed there, it acquired the name "Little Metropolis" because it was located within the bounds of the residence of the Metropolitan of Athens. Following the Greek War of Independence, the church was abandoned. From 1841 it housed the public library of Athens until 1863, when it was re-dedicated as a church, first to Christ the Saviour, and then to Saint Eleutherios. In 1856, the church underwent restoration to its original state, in which its more recent additions, such as its bell-tower, were removed.

On 16 January 2023, the Little Metropolis was used as the location of the lying-in-state of Constantine II of Greece, the last King of the Hellenes, whom a "crowd of thousands" prostrated and mourned.

== Description ==
The church has a typical Byzantine layout, being cross-in-square, with a three-aisled nave with the central aisle higher than the flanking ones. The octagonal dome was originally supported by four columns, but these were replaced in the 19th century by piers. It is a small structure, just 7.6 metres (25 ft) long and 12.2 metres (40 ft) wide. The walls are built exclusively of reused marble spolia, comprising undecorated masonry up to the height of the windows, and featuring a total of ninety sculptures above that; this feature makes the church unique among Byzantine sacred architecture. Unlike common practice in contemporary Byzantine architecture, no bricks have been used, except for the dome. Its interior was originally decorated entirely with frescoes, but only one of these survives today: an image of the Panagia over the entrance apse.

== Gallery ==
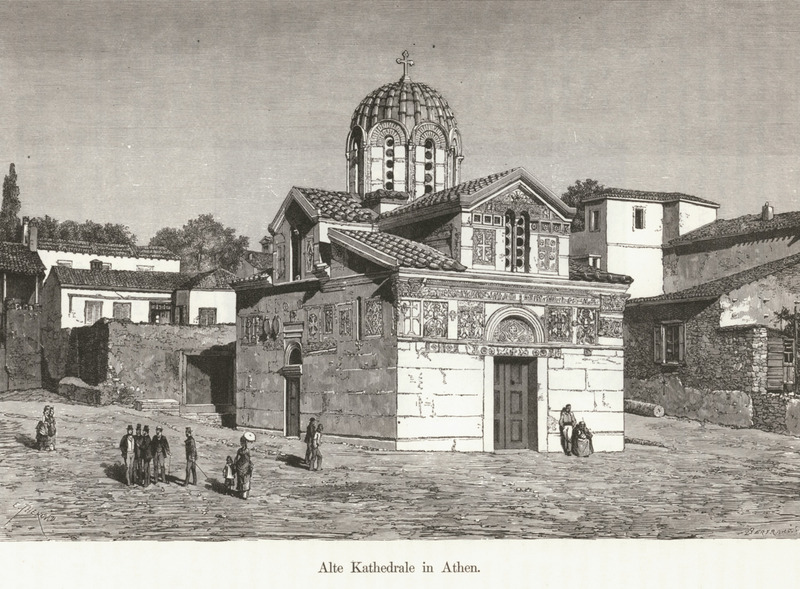
Sketch of 1887

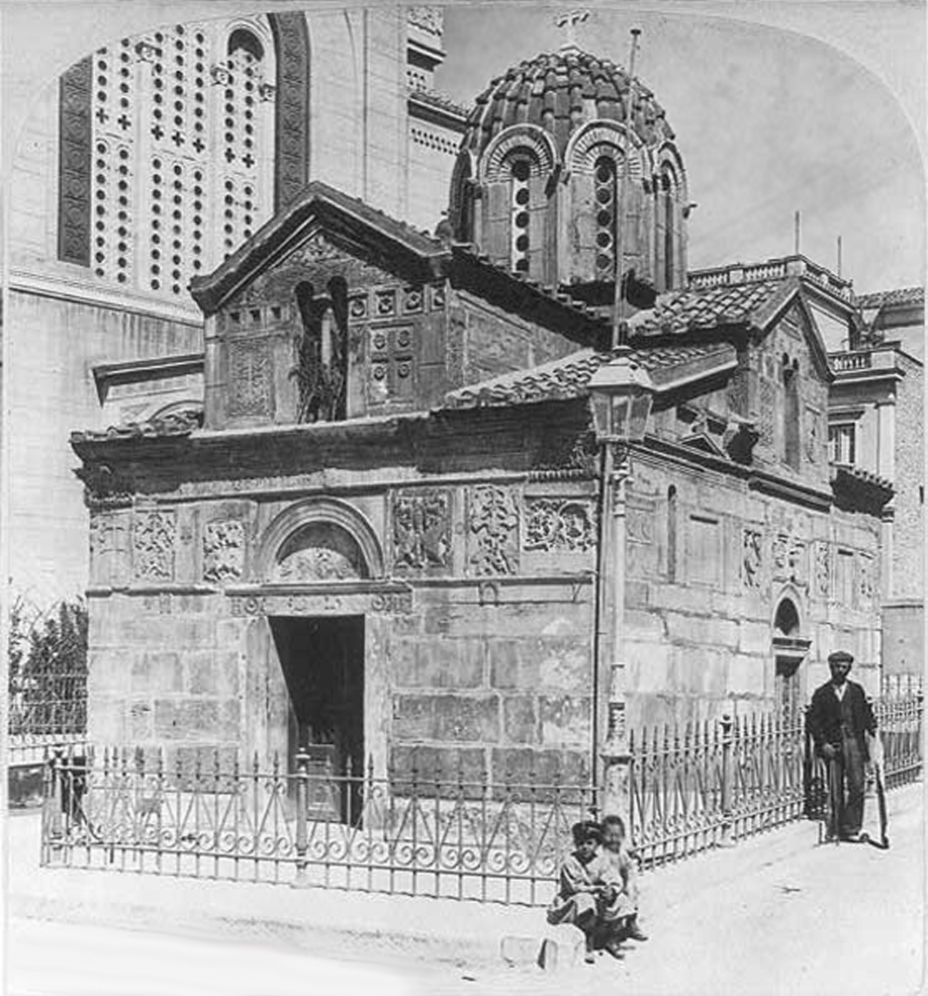
Photo of 1901

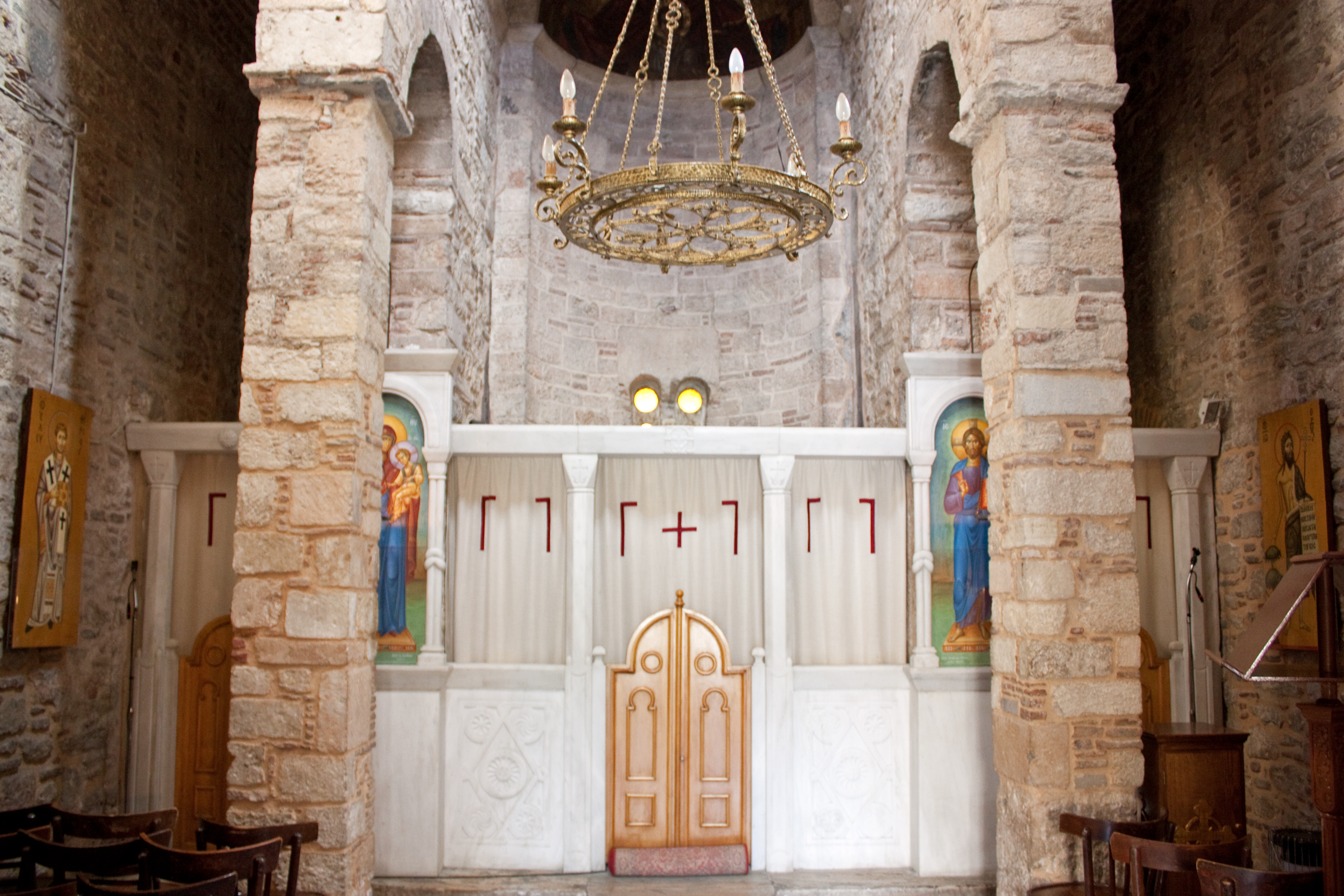
Interior

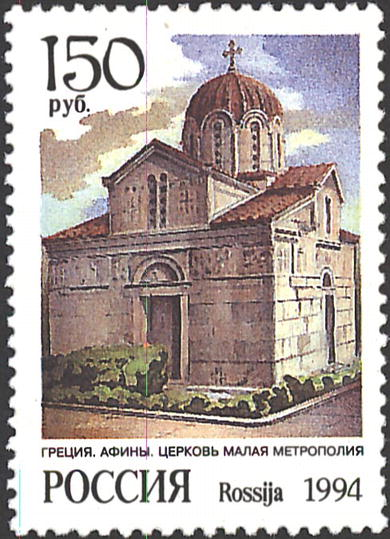
The church on a Russian stamp of 1994

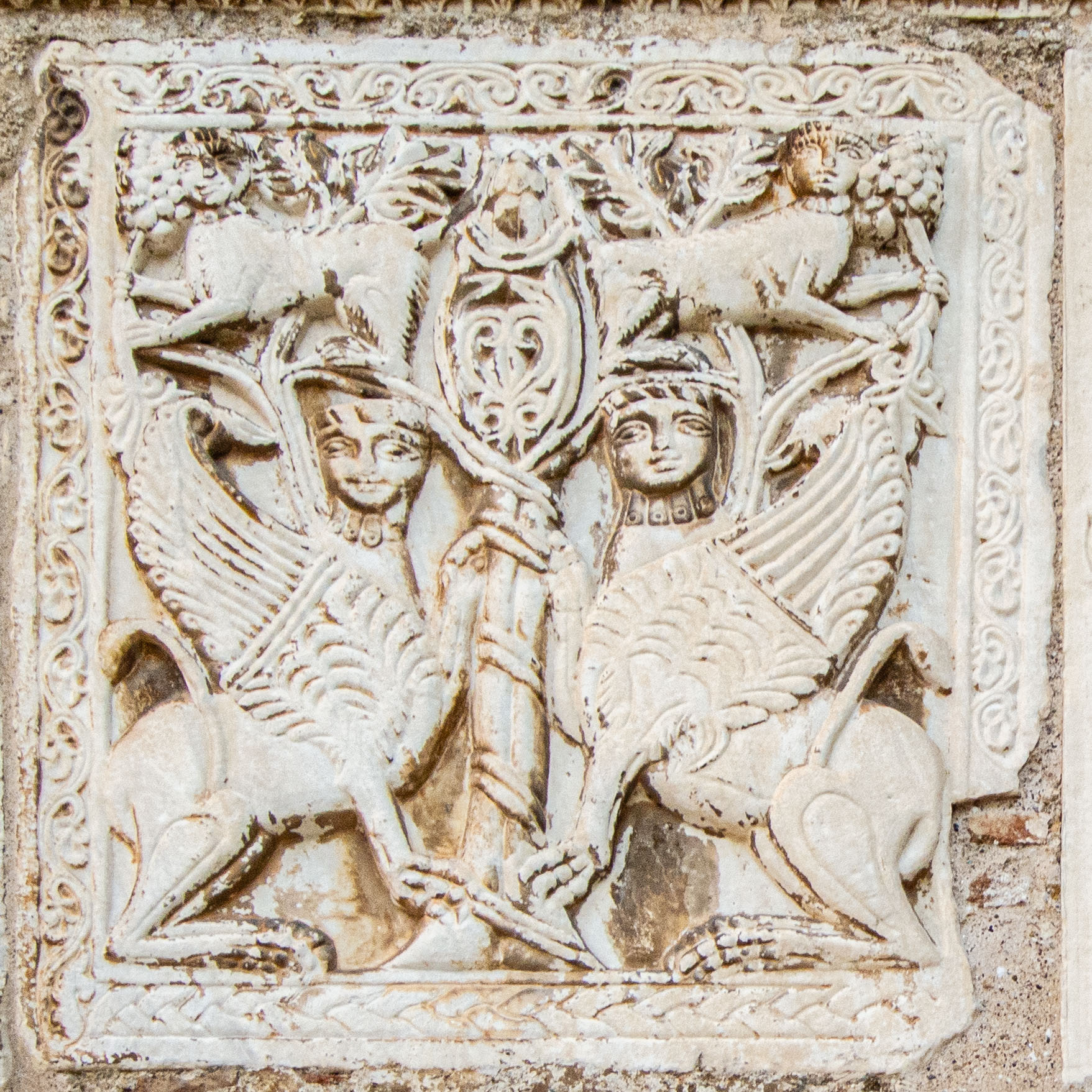

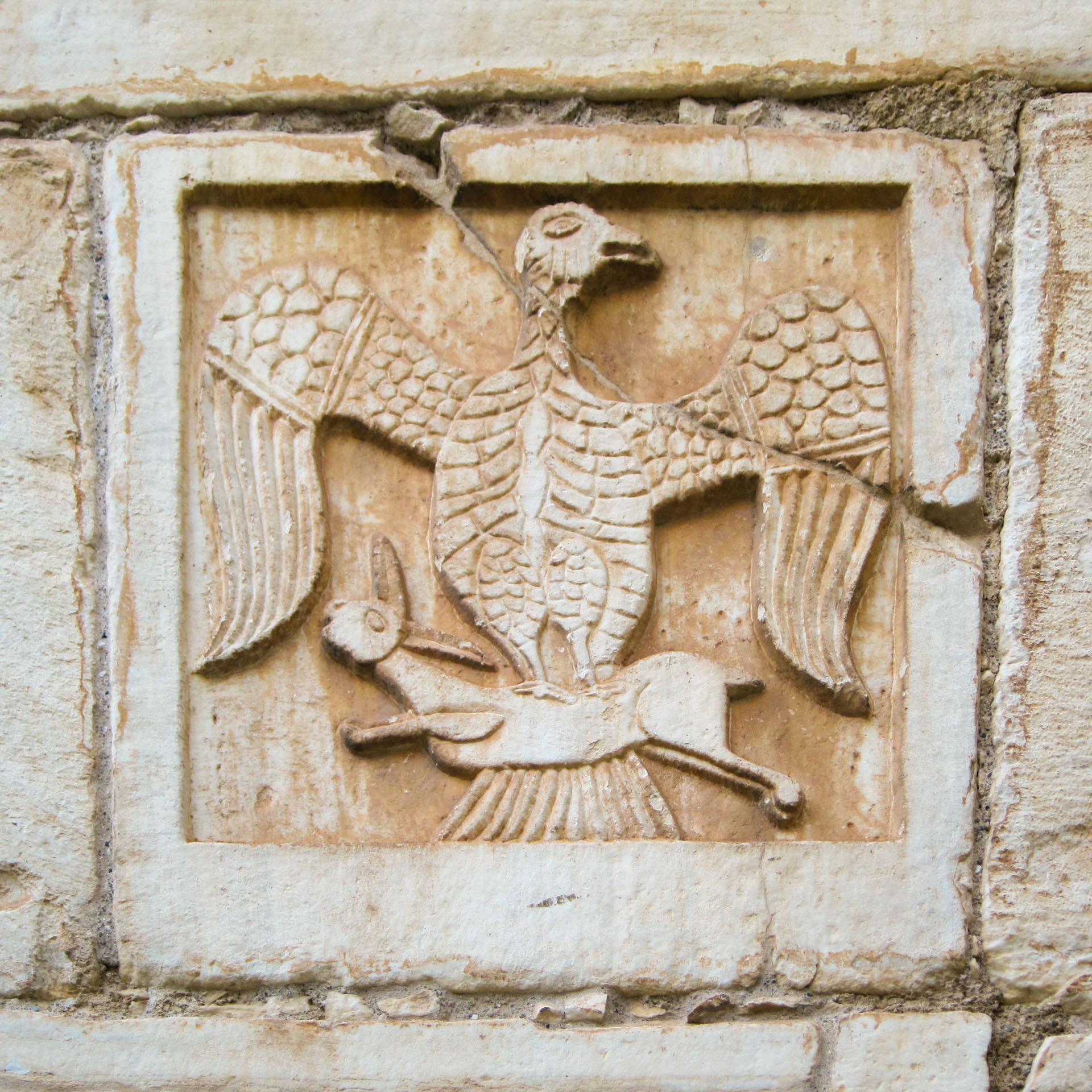

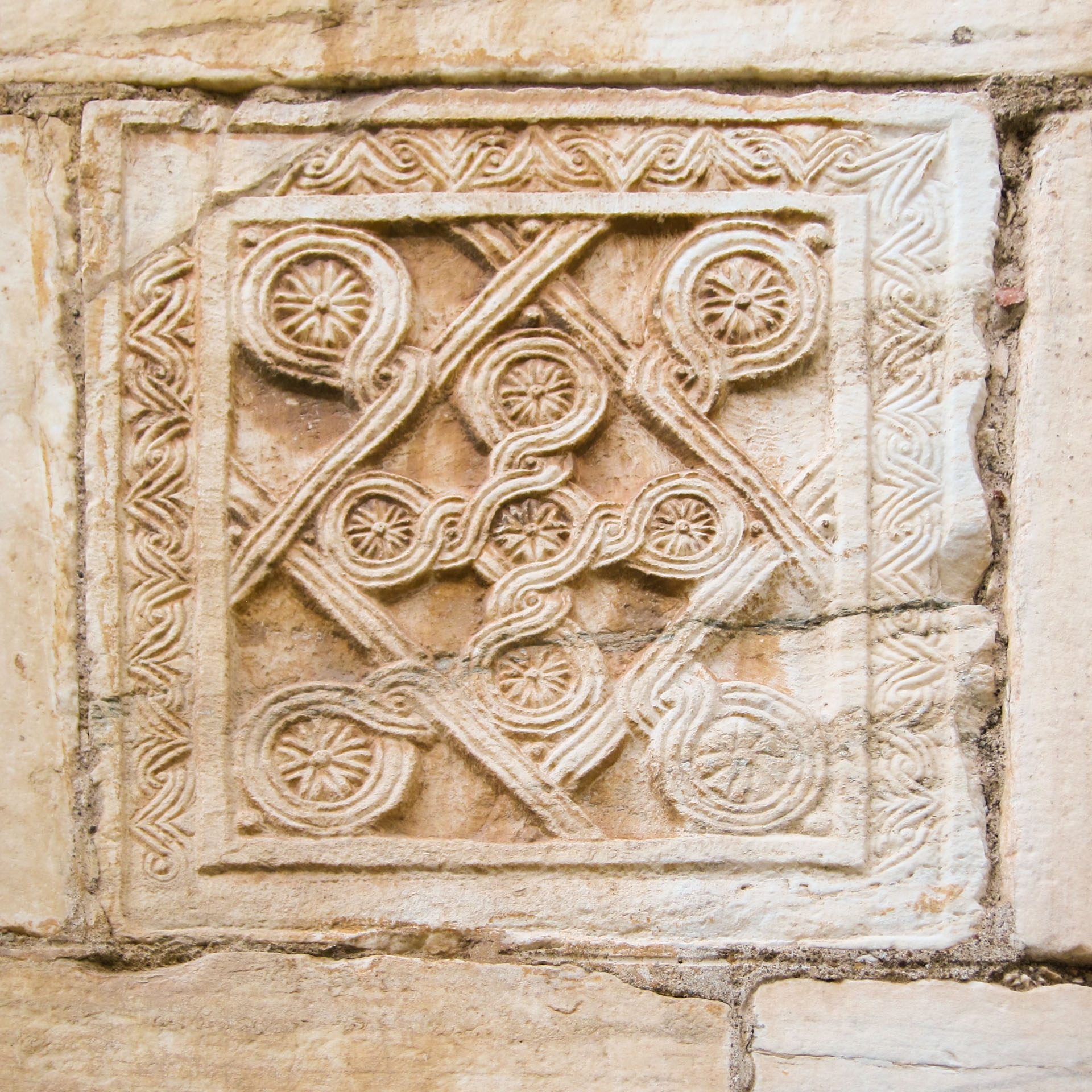

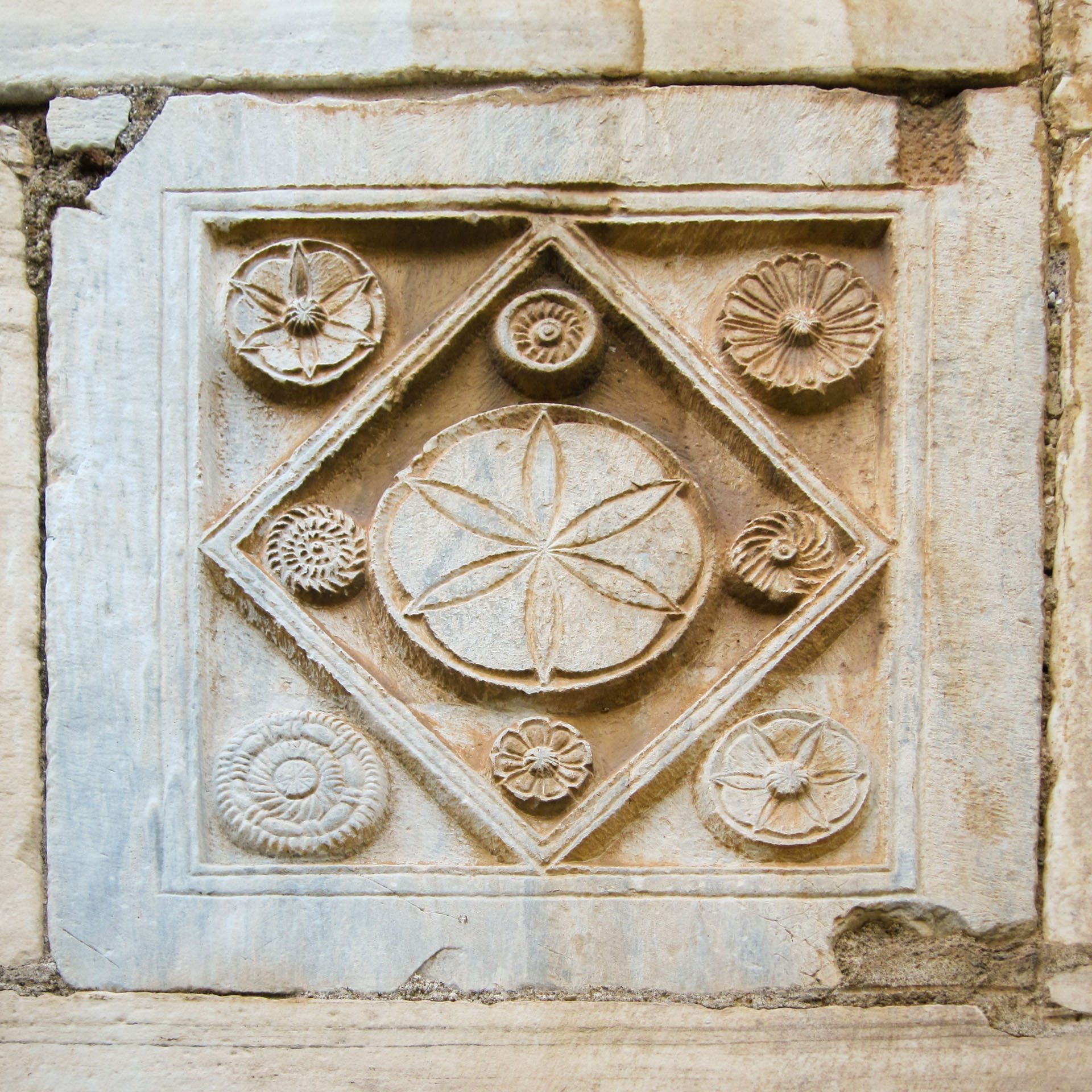

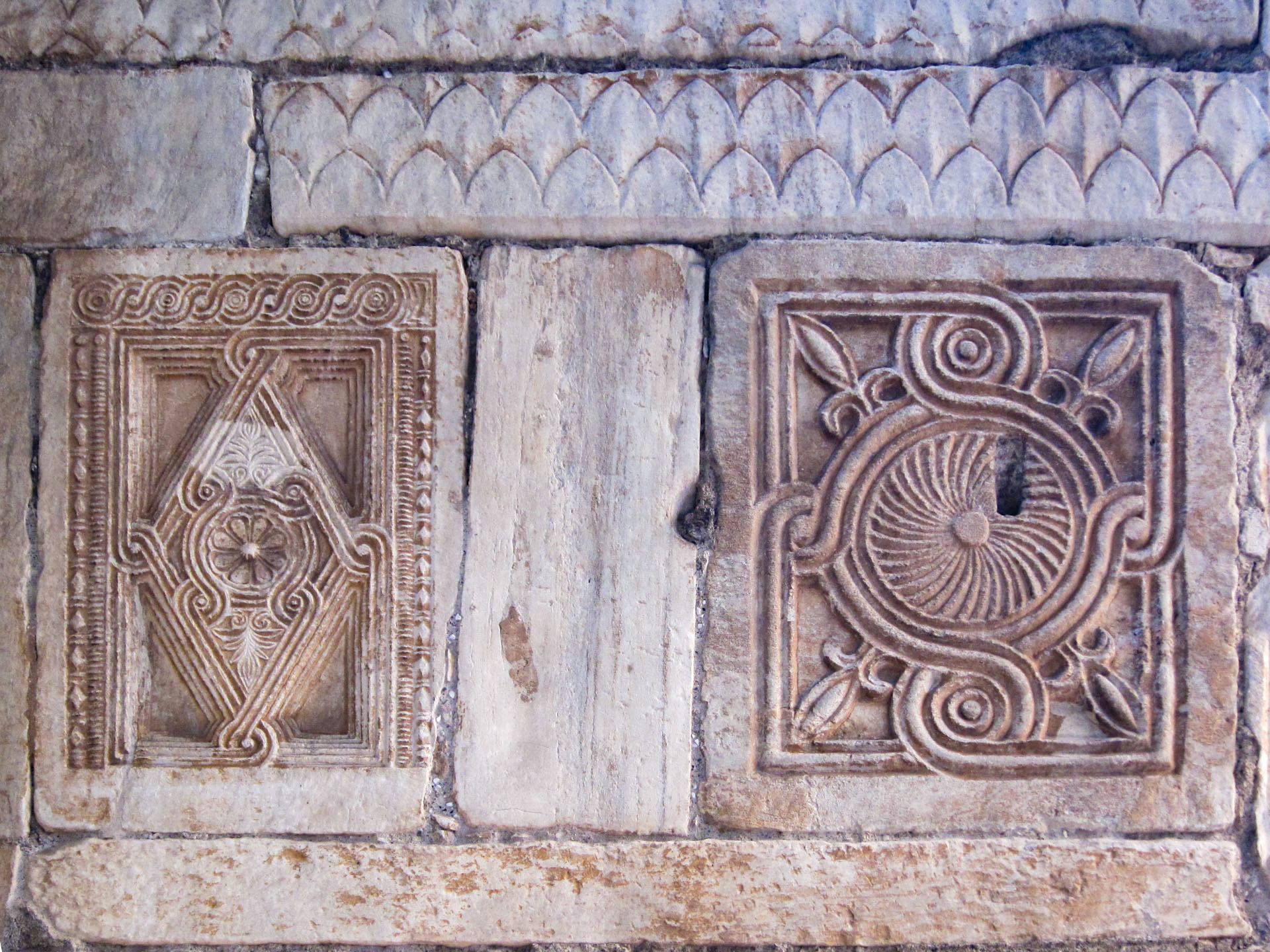

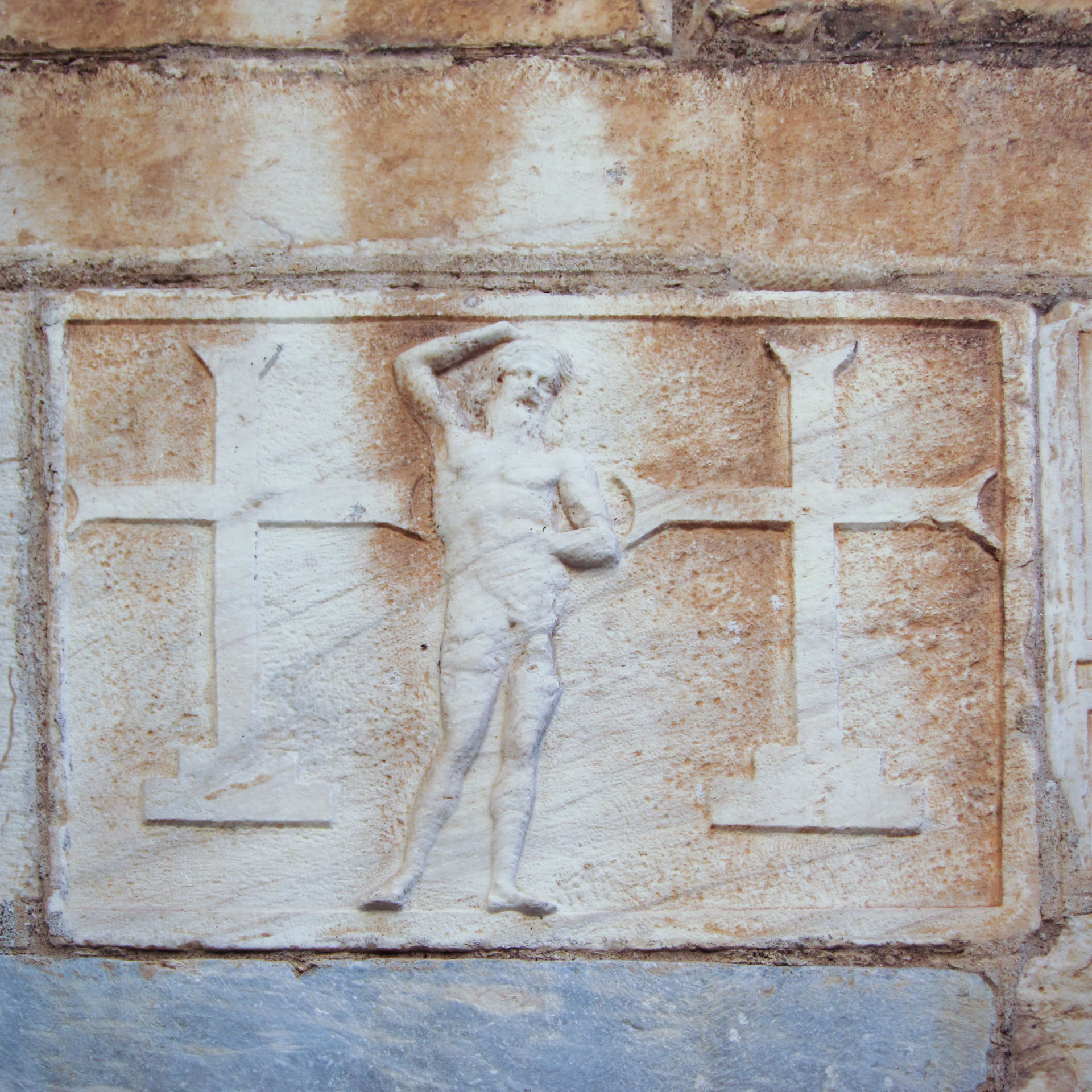

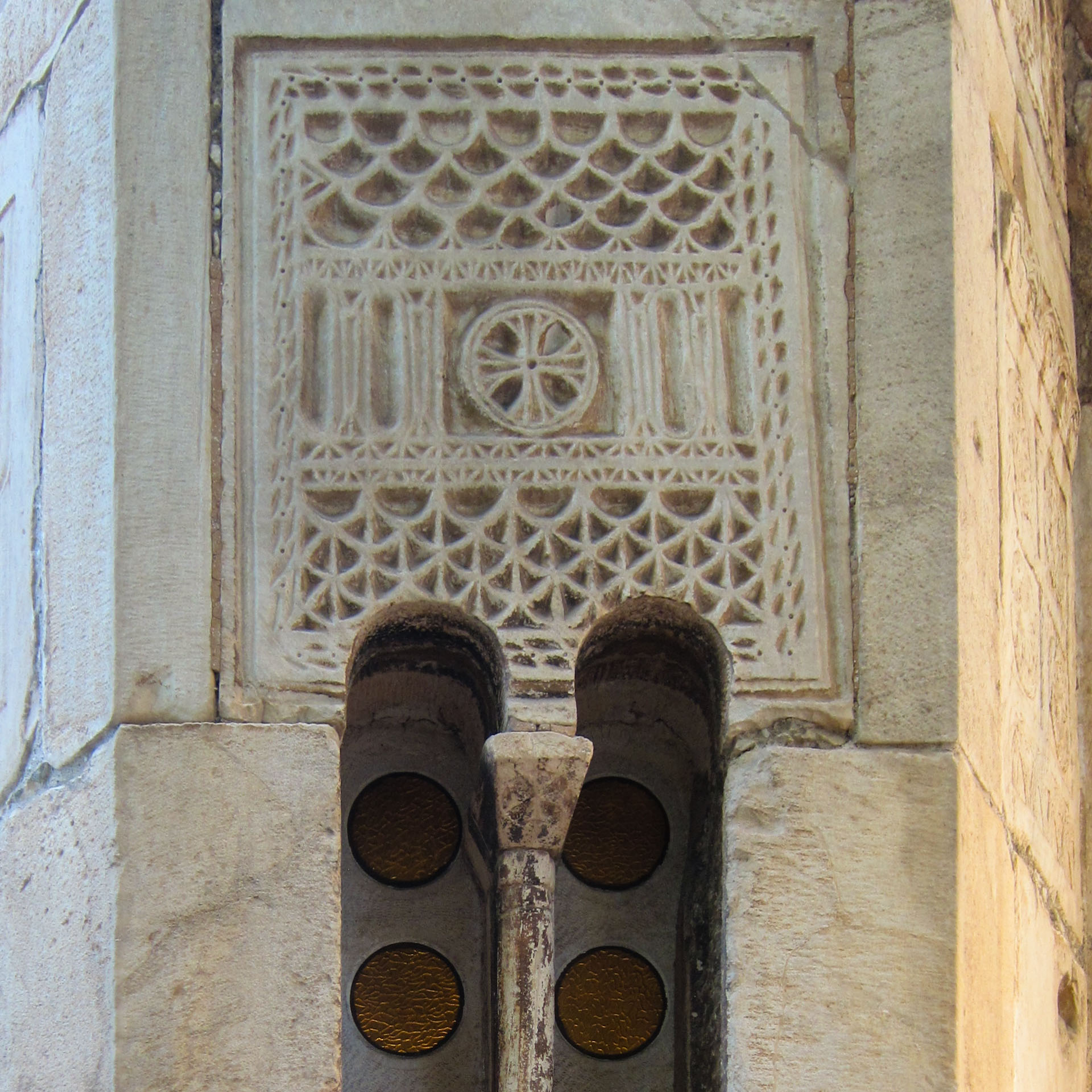

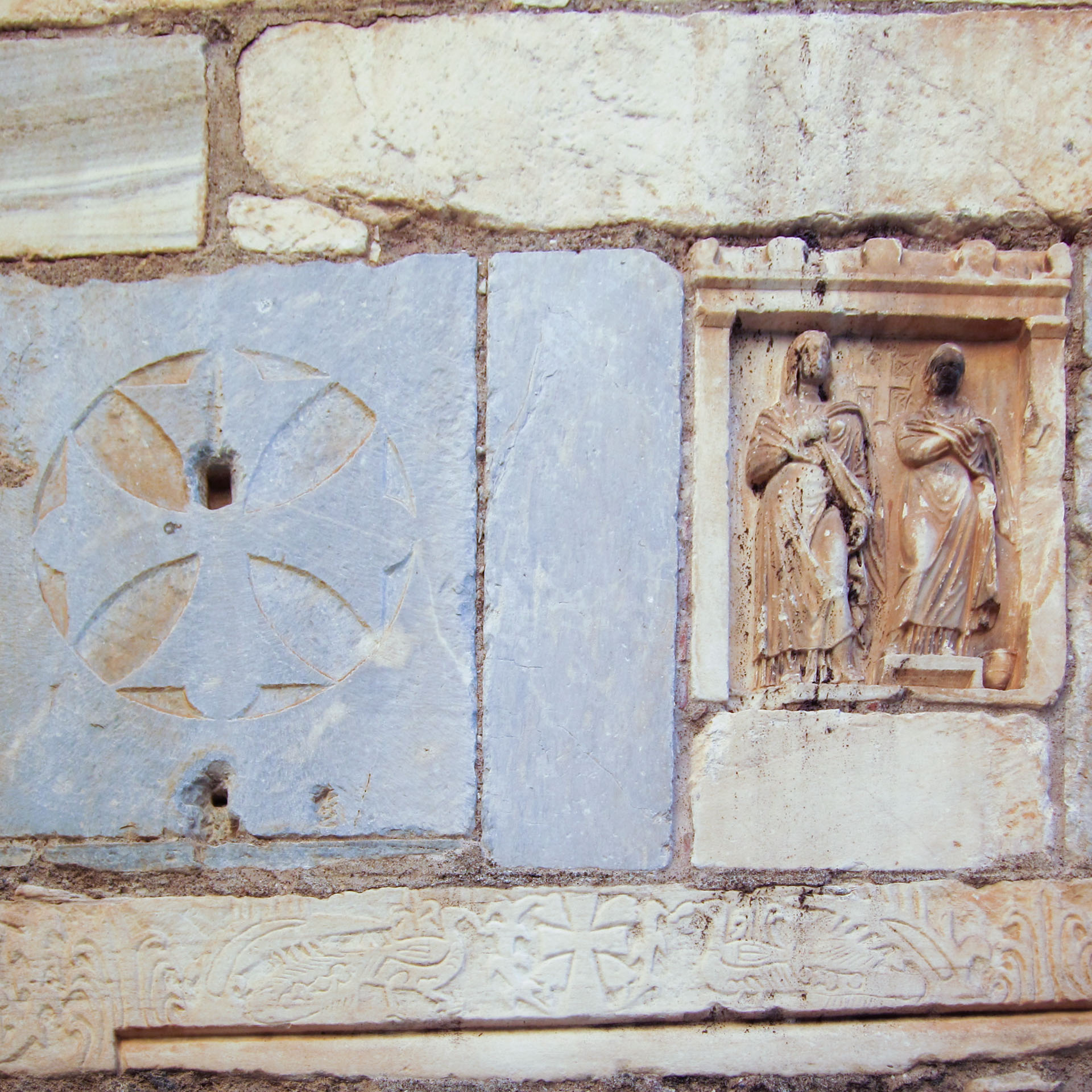

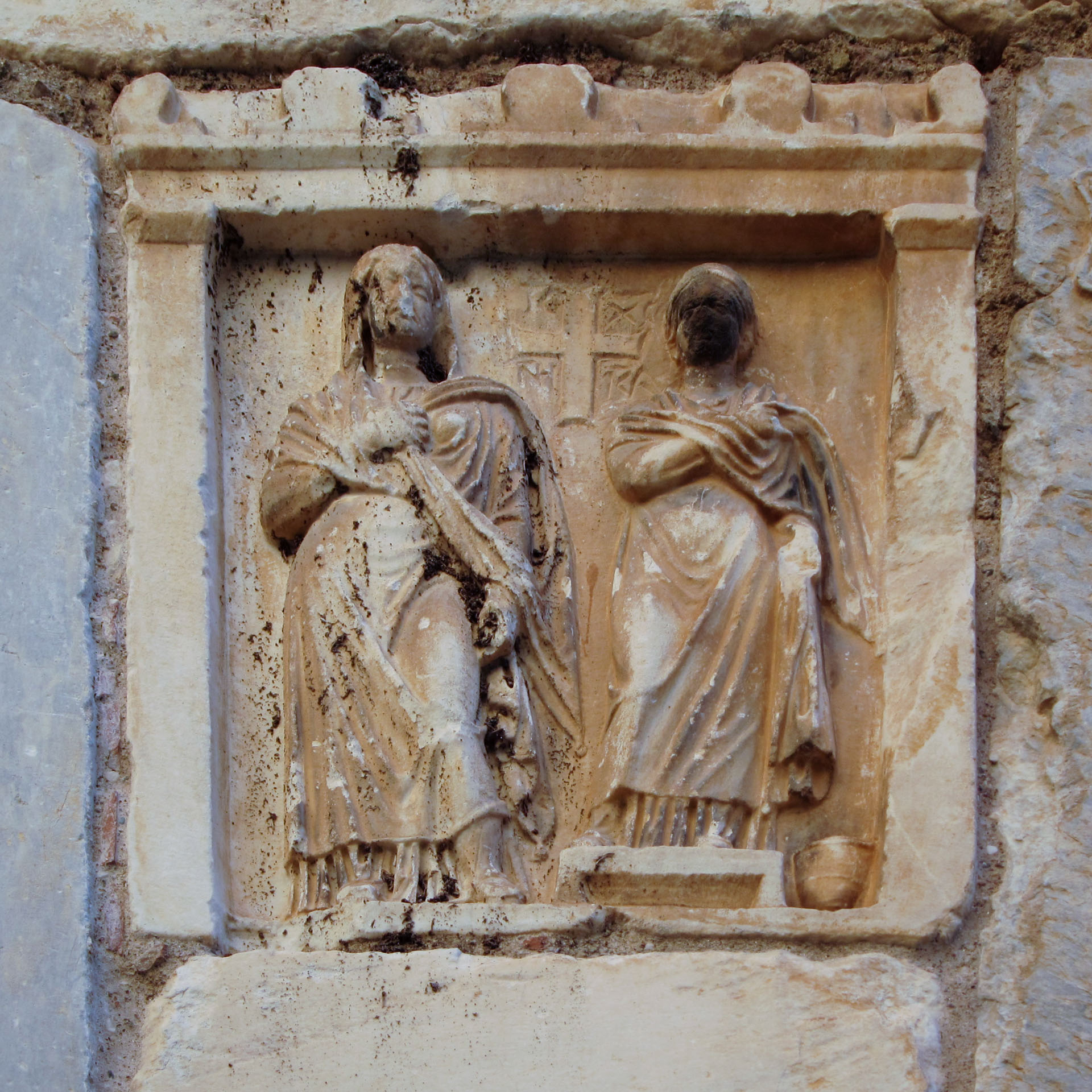

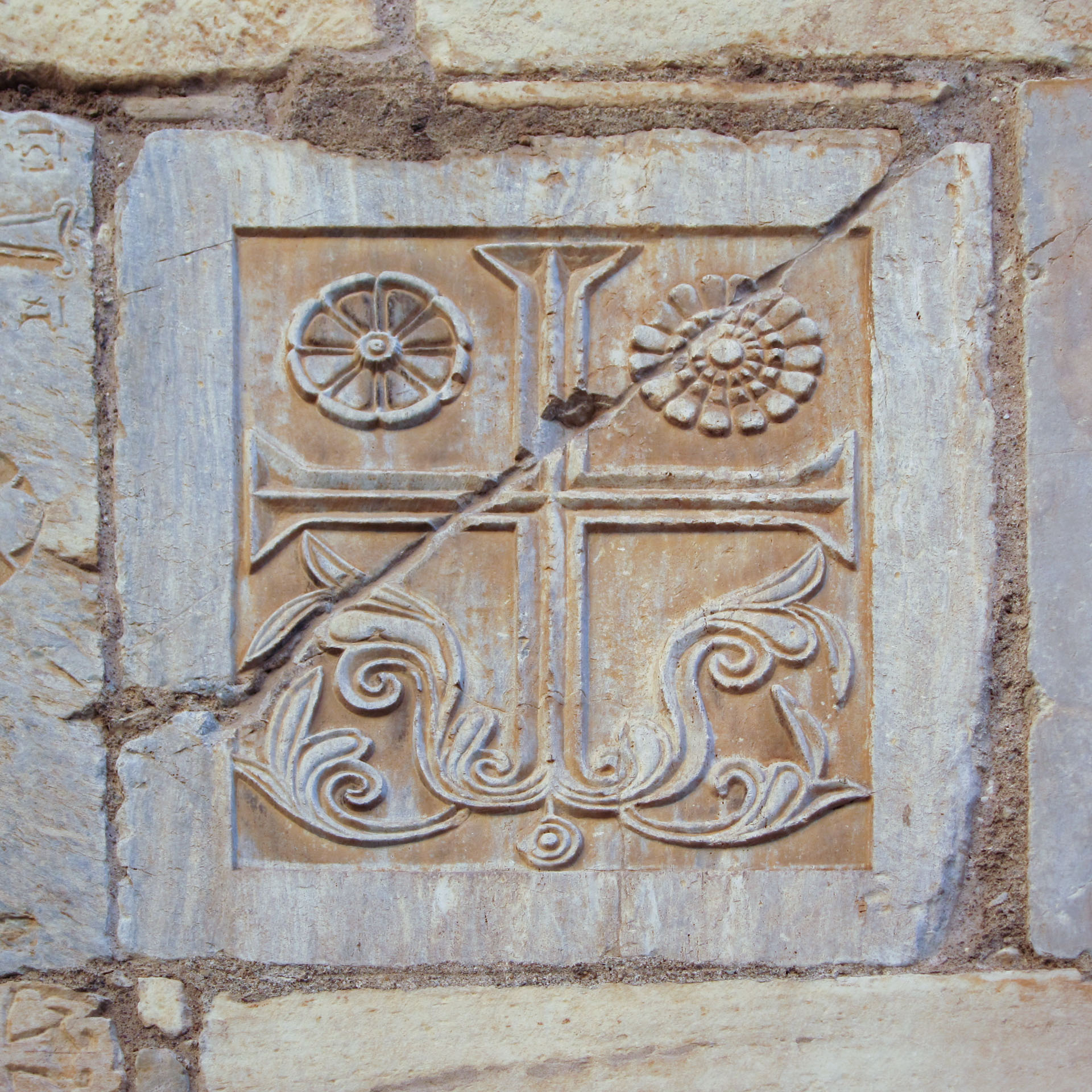

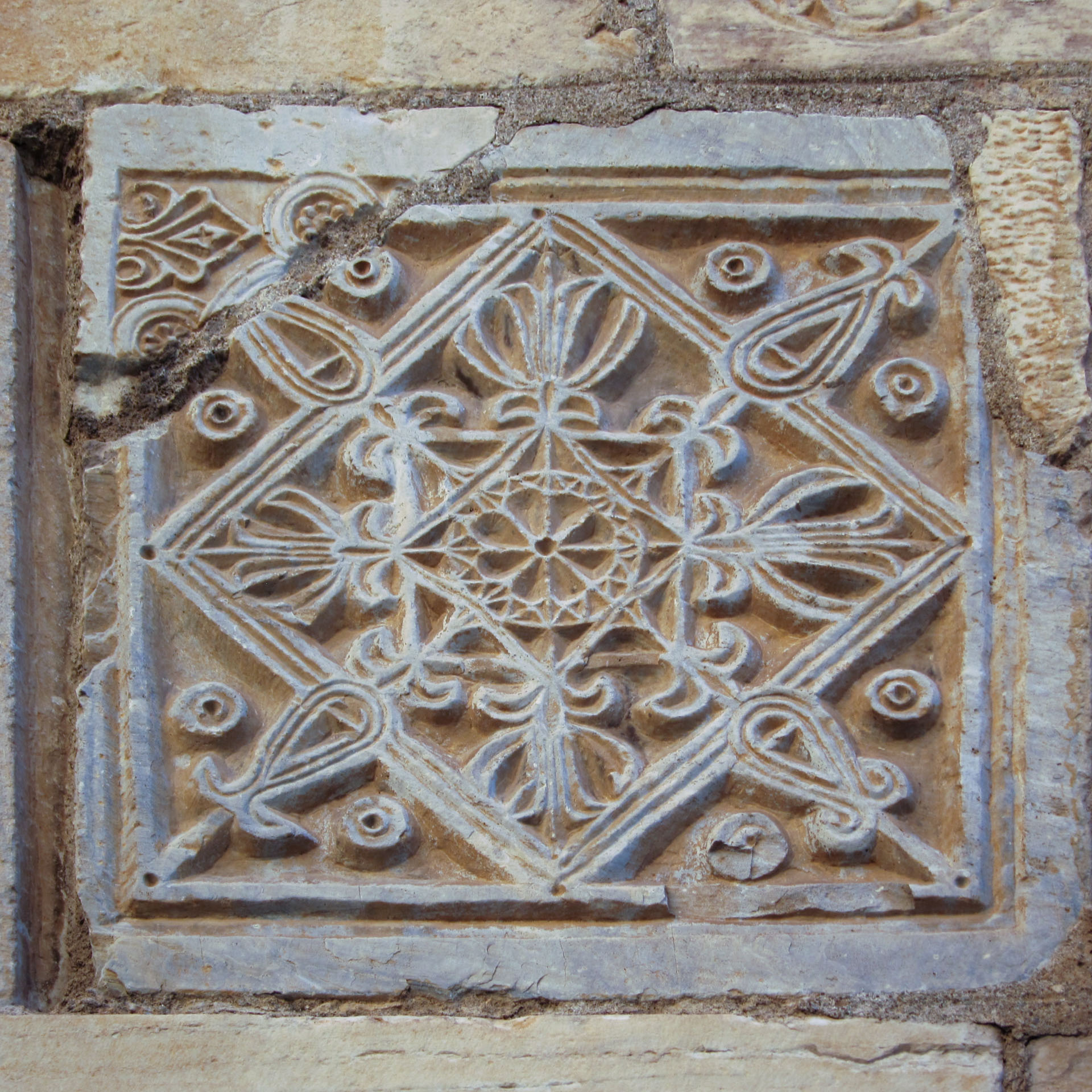

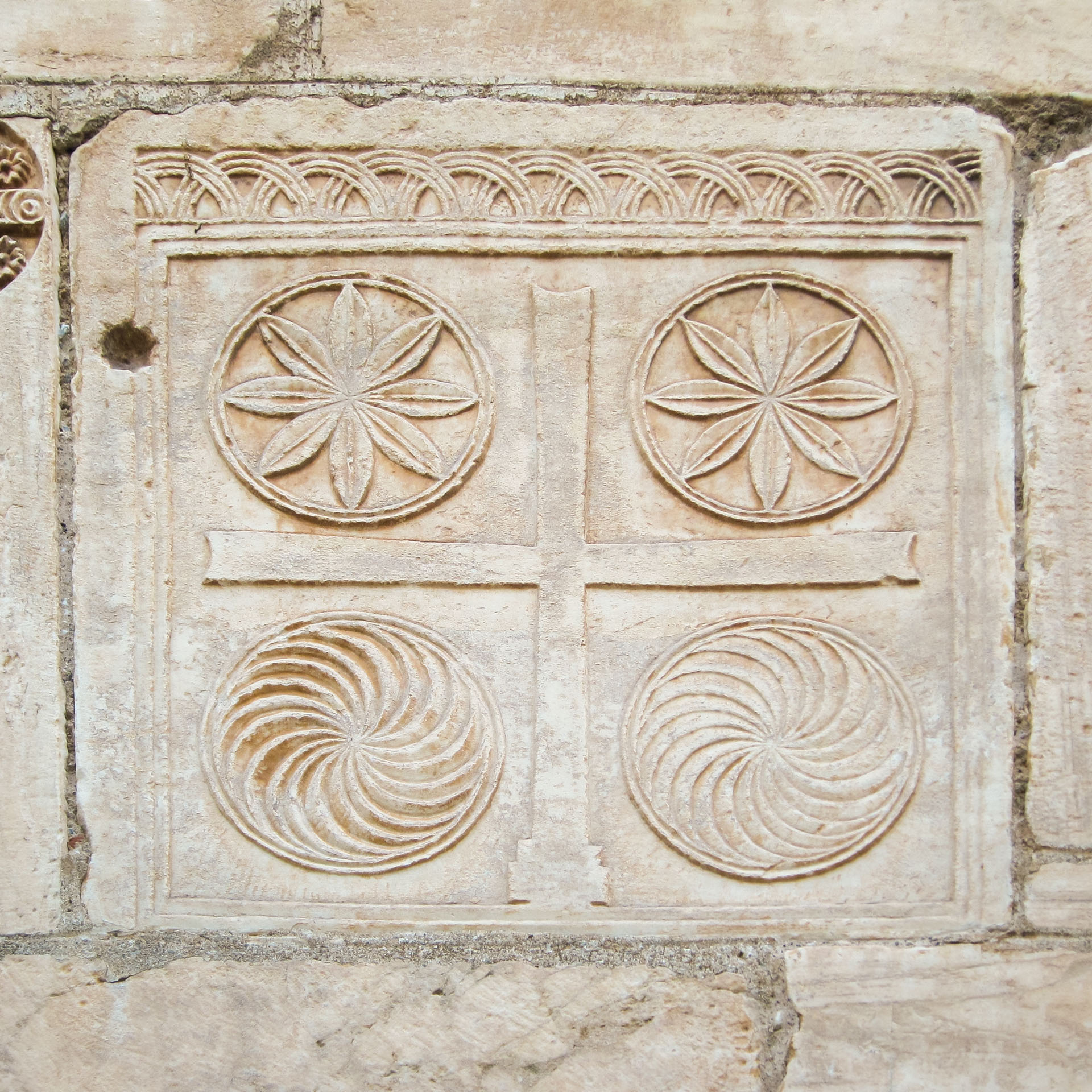

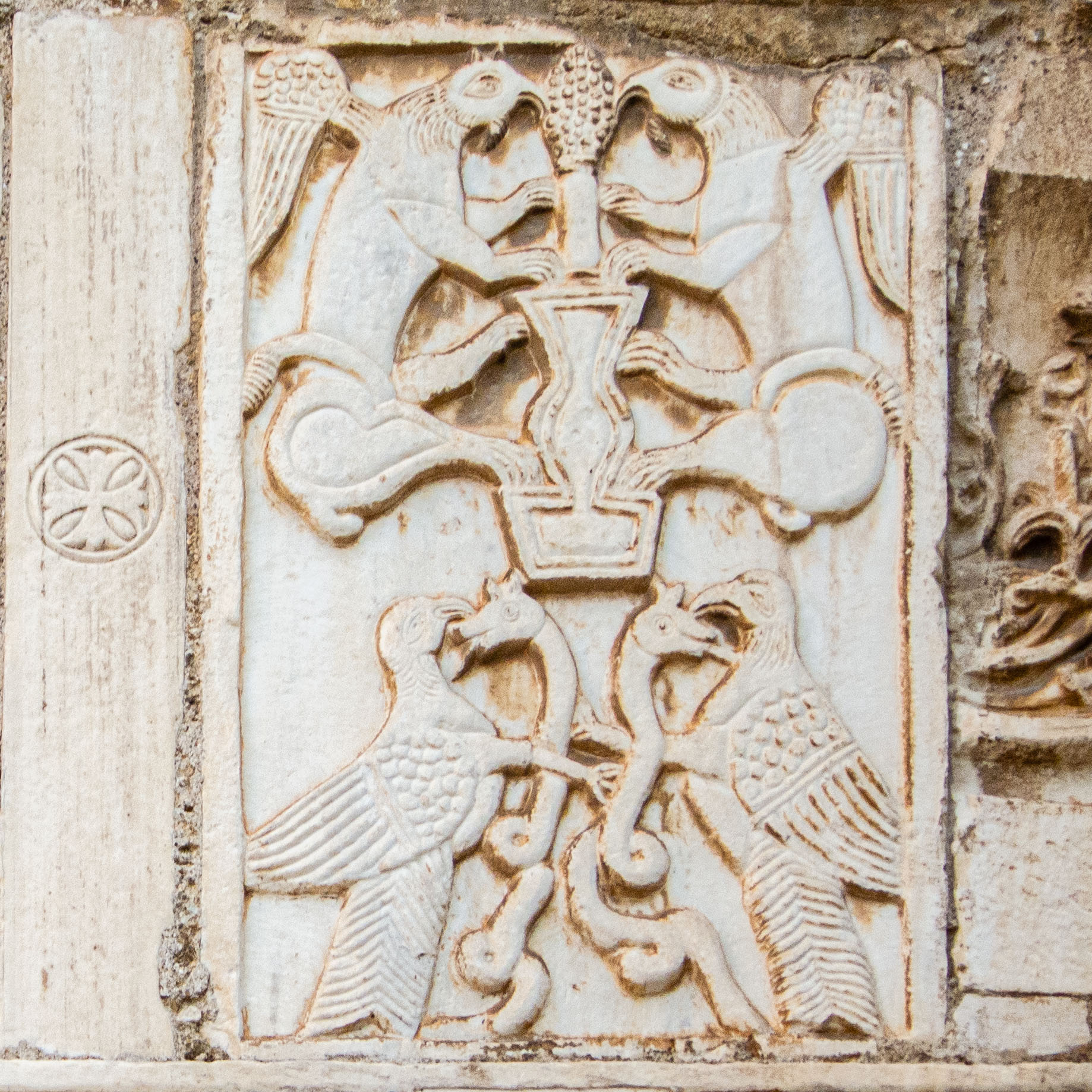

== Sources ==
Media related to Panagía Gorgoepíkoös at Wikimedia Commons

- Freely, John (2004). Strolling through Athens: Fourteen Unforgettable Walks through Europe's Oldest City. Tauris Parke Paperbacks. ISBN 978-1-85043-595-2.
- Kiilerich, Bente (2005). "Making Sense of the Spolia in the Little Metropolis in Athens". Arte Medievale. New Series. IV (2): 95–114.
