= Talaf =

Talaf طلف
- Village
- Location in Syria
- Coordinates: 34°54′39″N 36°33′40″E
- Country: Syria
- Governorate: Hama
- District: Hama
- Subdistrict: Hirbnafsah

Population (2004)
  - Total: 7,000

Talaf (Arabic: طلف) is a village in northwestern Syria, administratively part of the Hama Governorate, located southwest of Hama. Nearby localities include Musa al-Houla to the north, Hirbnafsah to the northeast, Kisin to the east, Burj Qa'i to the south, Taldou to the southwest and Kafr Laha and Tell Dahab to the west. According to the Syria Central Bureau of Statistics, Talaf had a population of 7,000 in the 2004 census. Its inhabitants are predominantly Sunni Muslims of Turkmen descent.

== Gallery ==
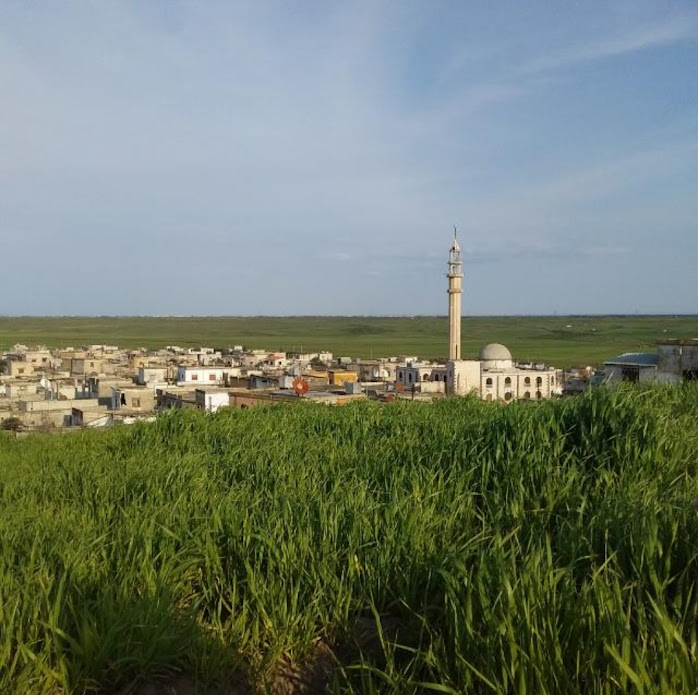

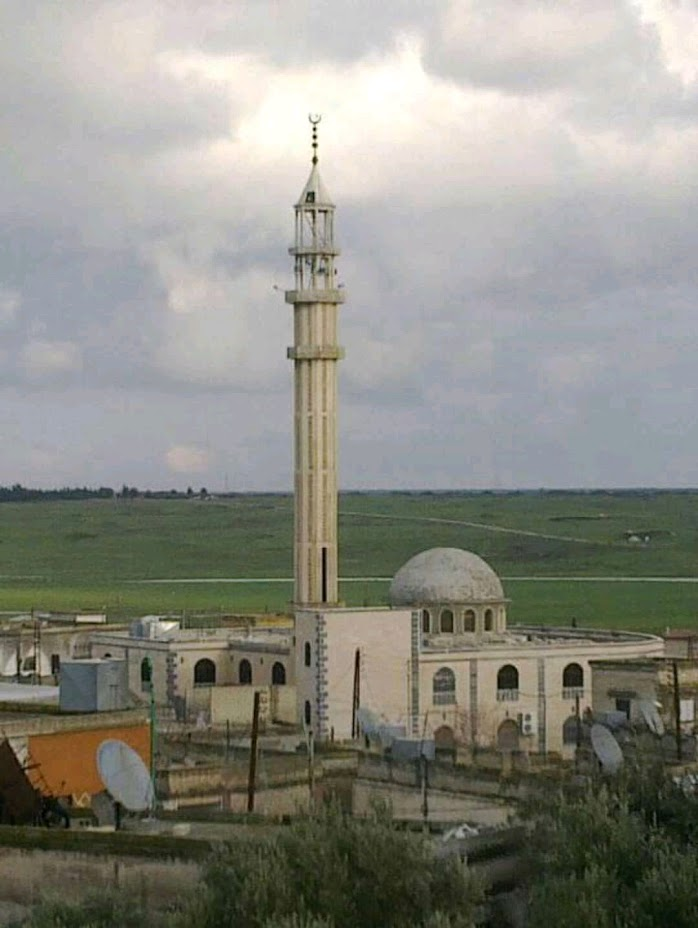

== Bibliography ==
- Hartmann, Martin (2012). Reisebriefe aus Syrien (in German). Books on Demand. ISBN 978-3864448010.
- Robinson, E.; Smith, E. (1841). Biblical Researches in Palestine, Mount Sinai and Arabia Petraea: A Journal of Travels in the year 1838. Vol. 3. Boston: Crocker & Brewster.
