= Hadidah =

Hadidah حديدة Hadideh
- Town
- Location in Syria
- Coordinates: 34°40′25″N 36°23′48″E
- Country: Syria
- Governorate: Homs
- District: Talkalakh
- Subdistrict: Hadidah

Population (2004)
  - Total: 2,544
- Time zone: UTC+3 (EET)
  - Summer (DST): UTC+2 (EEST)

Hadidah (Arabic: حديدة, also spelled Hadideh) is a town in the northwestern Syria, administratively part of the Homs Governorate, located west of Homs and just east of the border with Lebanon. Nearby localities include Liftaya to the southeast, Khirbet al-Hamam to the east, Shin to the north, Mizyeneh and al-Huwash to the northwest, and al-Zarah and Talkalakh to the west. According to the Syria Central Bureau of Statistics (CBS), Hadidah had a population of 2,544 in the 2004 census. It is the administrative center of the Hadidah nahiyah ("subdistrict") which consists of 27 localities with a collective population of 25,998 in 2004. The inhabitants of the town are predominantly Alawites.

== Bibliography ==
- Conder, C. R. (1885). Heth and Moab : explorations in Syria in 1881 and 1882. London: R. Bentley & Son.
- Robinson, E.; Smith, E. (1841). Biblical Researches in Palestine, Mount Sinai and Arabia Petraea: A Journal of Travels in the year 1838. Vol. 3. Boston: Crocker & Brewster.
