= Panagia Gorgoepikoos Monastery, Mandra =

Panagia Gorgoepikoos Monastery
- Ιερά Μονή Παναγίας Γοργοεπηκόου
- Interactive map of Panagia Gorgoepikoos Monastery

Monastery information
- Established: 1965
- Dedication: Nativity of the Theotokos
- Celebration: September 8
- Diocese: Metropolis of Megara and Salamis

Site
- Location: Mandra, Attica
- Country: Greece
- Coordinates: 38°3′40″N 23°27′54″E

The Holy Monastery Panagia Gorgoepikoos (Greek: Ιερά Μονή Παναγίας Γοργοεπηκόου) is an ecclesiastical institution-monastery of the 20th century, which is located in the region of Mandra, Attica and belongs to the Holy Metropolis of Megara and Salamis. It is a women's monastery to which the faithful attribute numerous miracles connected to the holy icon of the Most Holy Theotokos. The monastery is located on a hill that dominates the area with a view towards the Thriasio Pedio and the Gulf of Elefsina.

The holy monastery of Panagia Gorgoepikoos was dedicated to the worship of the Virgin Mary, as the icon of the Most Holy Theotokos is stored there, a copy of the original icon of the Virgin Mary located in the holy monastery of Docheiariou on Mount Athos.

The monastery is one of the newest buildings in Attica, as its establishment was decided in the year 1975, by the will of four monks to create a place of spiritual exercise and prayer in the area. The monastery is a communal space for women and belongs to the holy Metropolis of Megara and Salamis. It is located in the area of the Thriasian field and celebrates on September 8, the Nativity of the Theotokos.

== Bibliographic sources ==
- https://www.athensmagazine.gr/article/news/ellada/648663-panagia-gorgoephkoos-to-monasthri-sth-mandra-attikhs-me-to-thaymatoyrgo-eikonisma-apo-to-agio-oros
- https://www.vimaorthodoxias.gr/monastiria-tou-kosmou/monastiri-panagias-gorgoepikoou-mandra-attikis-foto/
- https://gorgoepikoos.gr/i-istoria-tis-eikonas-tis-panagias-gorgoepikooy/
- https://www.ekklisiaonline.gr/nea/iera-moni-panagias-gorgoepikoou-mandras-attikis/
