= Kafr Laha =

Kafr Laha كفرلاها Kafar Laha
- City
- Location in Syria
- Coordinates: 34°52′59″N 36°30′0″E
- Country: Syria
- Governorate: Homs
- District: Taldou
- Subdistrict: Kafr Laha

Population (2004)
  - Total: 20,041
- Time zone: UTC+3 (AST)

Kafr Laha (Arabic: كفرلاها) is a City in the Homs Governorate north of Homs in northern Syria. In 2004 it had a population of 20,041 according to the Central Bureau of Statistics of Syria. Its inhabitants are predominantly Sunni Muslims. It is the largest city in the Houla region. Nearby localities include Talaf to the northeast, Tell Dahab to the north, Aqrab to the northwest, Qarmas and Maryamin to the west, al-Taybah al-Gharbiyah to the southwest and Taldou to the southeast.

== History ==
Kafr Laha has been identified as the ancient Aramaean settlement of Byt'l also known as "Bethel".

According to 16th century Ottoman Defter records, Kafr Laha's population increased from 23 households in 1526 to 47 households in 1594.

Kafr Laha has been the site of demonstrations against the Assad government during the Syrian uprising which began in 2011.

== Bibliography ==
- Smith, Eli; Robinson, Edward (1841). Biblical Researches in Palestine, Mount Sinai and Arabia Petraea: A Journal of Travels in the Year 1838. Vol. 3. Crocker and Brewster.
