= Taldou District =

Taldou District منطقة تلدو
- District
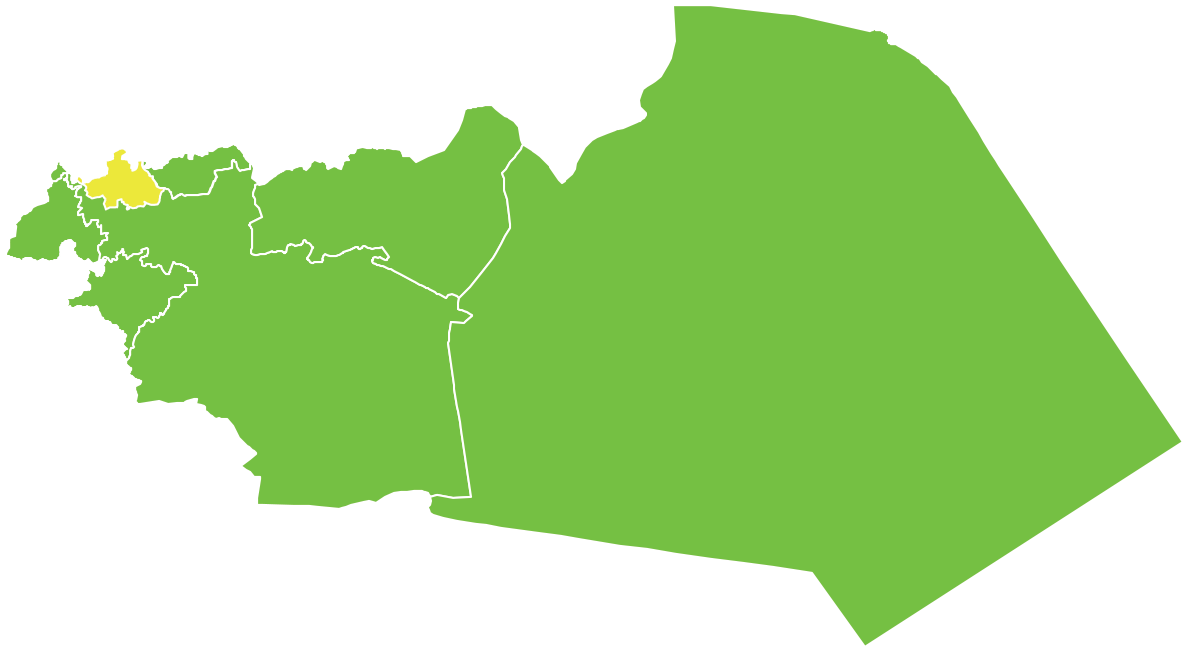
- Map of Taldou District within Homs Governorate
- Coordinates (Taldou): 34°52′59″N 36°30′00″E
- Country: Syria
- Governorate: Homs
- Seat: Taldou
- Subdistricts: 3 nawāḥī

Area
  - Total: 264.1 km^{2} (102.0 sq mi)

Population (2004)
  - Total: 90,139
  - Density: 341.3/km^{2} (884.0/sq mi)
- Geocode: SY0407

Taldou District (Arabic: منطقة تلدو, romanized: manṭiqat Taldou) is a district of the Homs Governorate in central Syria. Administrative centre is the City of Taldou. The Northwestern Quadrant of the District is within Wadi al-Nasara, an Antiochian Greek Orthodox population region and cultural area. Krak Des Chevaliers, a famous Crusader Castle, is in the northwesternmost edge of the district.

The district was formed in 2010 from three sub-districts formerly belonging to Homs District. At the 2004 census, these sub-districts had a total population of 90,139.

== Sub-districts ==
The district of Taldou is divided into three sub-districts or nawāḥī (population as of 2004):

- Taldou Subdistrict (ناحية تلدو): population 71,503.
- Kafr Laha Subdistrict (ناحية كفرلاها): population 20,041.
- Al-Qabu Subdistrict (ناحية القبو): population 18,636.
