= Qasraya =

Qasraya قصرايا
- Village
- Location in Syria
- Coordinates: 34°53′11″N 36°24′48″E
- Country: Syria
- Governorate: Hama
- District: Masyaf
- Subdistrict: Awj

Population (2004)
  - Total: 982
- Time zone: UTC+3 (AST)
- City Qrya Pcode: C3399

Qasraya (Arabic: قصرايا) is a Syrian village located in Awj Nahiyah in Masyaf District, Hama. According to the Syria Central Bureau of Statistics (CBS), Qasraya had a population of 982 in the 2004 census.
