= Bente Kiilerich =

Danish–Norwegian art historian

Bente Knold Kiilerich (born 31 January 1954) is a Danish-born Norwegian scholar of art history, in particular Hellenistic art, Roman art, Byzantine art, and modern reception of classical art. She served as an active professor at the University of Bergen from 1995–2024 and is a member of the Norwegian Academy of Science and Letters.

== Biography ==
Bente Kiilerich was born in Copenhagen, Denmark on 31 January 1954. She did her graduate studies at the University of Copenhagen, where she earned a MA in classical archeology in 1985 and a PhD in art history in 1993. Her book Græsk skulptur: fra dædalisk til hellenistisk ("Greek Sculpture: From Daedalic to Hellenistic") went through 8 editions between 1989 and 2007. She was appointed a professor of art history at the University of Bergen in Bergen, Norway in 1995. She was elected to the Norwegian Academy of Science and Letters in 1998. She also served as president of the Norwegian branch of the International Association of Byzantine Studies. Since 2021, she has been the Editor-in-Chief of CLARA: Classical Art and Archaeology, an open-access journal published by the University of Oslo.

In 1 February 2024, she took emeritus status with the University of Bergen.
