= Al-Qabu, Syria =

Al-Qabu القبو Kabu
- Town
- Location in Syria
- Coordinates: 34°50′38″N 36°27′11″E
- Country: Syria
- Governorate: Homs
- District: Homs
- Subdistrict: Al-Qabu
- Elevation: 542 m (1,778 ft)

Population (2004)
  - Total: 4,870
- Time zone: UTC+3 (AST)

Al-Qabu (Arabic: القبو, also spelled Kabu) is a town in central Syria, administratively part of the Homs Governorate, located 30 kilometers (19 mi) northwest of Homs. Nearby localities include al-Shinyah to the north, Taldou and Kafr Laha to the northeast, Sharqliyya to the east, al-Mahfurah to the south, Rabah to the southwest and Fahel to the west. According to the Syria Central Bureau of Statistics (CBS), al-Qabu had a population of 4,870 in the 2004 census. The inhabitants are predominantly Alawites.

Al-Qabu is both the administrative and commercial center of its subdistrict, providing essential services for the surrounding villages. It contains a police station, health center, telephone center, cultural center, agricultural and commercial advisory institutions, and primary, secondary and vocational schools. Government or public-sector jobs provided the bulk of employment as of 2009, with a small proportion engaged in agriculture. The principal crops were olive and fig trees, the orchards of which envelope the village. Al-Qabu lacked waste treatment and had a dearth of public and private transportation, despite the large number of residents working government jobs outside the town.

== Bibliography ==
- Robinson, E.; Smith, E. (1841). Biblical Researches in Palestine, Mount Sinai and Arabia Petraea: A Journal of Travels in the year 1838. Vol. 3. Boston: Crocker & Brewster.
