= Mizyeneh =

Mizyeneh المزينة
- Village
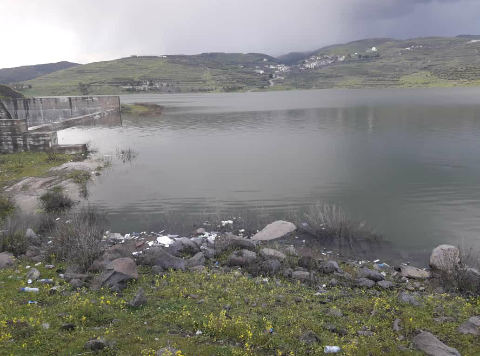
- Mizyeneh Dam

- Location in Syria
- Coordinates: 34°46′18″N 36°20′25″E
- Country: Syria
- Governorate: Homs
- District: Talkalakh
- Subdistrict: Al-Mzainah

Population (2004)
  - Total: 2,769
- Time zone: UTC+2 (EET)
  - Summer (DST): +3
- City Qrya Pcode: C2855

Mizyeneh or Mazyanah (Arabic: المزينة) is a small Greek Orthodox Christian village located in Western Syria close to the Lebanese borders and administratively belonging to the Homs Governorate. According to the Syria Central Bureau of Statistics, Mizyeneh had a population of 2,769 in the 2004 census. Its inhabitants are predominantly Christians. The village has two Greek Orthodox Churches.
