= Taldou =

Taldou تلدو Talldū, Tall Daww, Taldo, Tall Dhu, Taldao
- City
- Location in Syria
- Coordinates: 34°52′59″N 36°30′0″E
- Country: Syria
- Governorate: Homs
- District: Taldou
- Subdistrict: Taldou

Population (2004)
  - Total: 15,727
- Time zone: UTC+3 (AST)

Taldou (Arabic: تلدو, romanized: Talldū, also spelled Tall Daww, Taldo, Tall Dhu or Taldao) is a City in the Houla region of northern Syria, north of Homs in the Homs Governorate. Nearby towns include Burj al-Qa'i to the east, Tallaf to the northeast, Kafr Laha and Tell Dahab to the north, Qarmas and Maryamin to the northwest, al-Taybah al-Gharbiyah and al-Shinyah to the west, Kabu to the southwest, Sharqliyya to the south and Ghur Gharbiyah to the southeast. In 2004 it had a population of 15,727 according to the Syria Central Bureau of Statistics. Its inhabitants are predominantly Sunni Muslims.

On 25 May 2012, together with the neighboring village al-Shumariyeh, Taldou was the scene of the Houla massacre in which 108 civilians, including 49 children and 32 women, were killed, allegedly by Syrian Army shelling and ground attacks by pro-government Shabeeha militiamen. As of 21 June 2012, government forces have been driven from the town center and are relegated to positions on the town's periphery. On 15 May 2018, Syrian forces retook the town.

== Bibliography ==
- Robinson, E.; Smith, E. (1841). Biblical Researches in Palestine, Mount Sinai and Arabia Petraea: A Journal of Travels in the year 1838. Vol. 3. Boston: Crocker & Brewster.
