= Shin, Syria =

Shin شين
- Town
- Location in Syria
- Coordinates: 34°47′0″N 36°26′0″E
- Country: Syria
- Governorate: Homs
- District: Homs
- Subdistrict: Shin
- Elevation: 800 m (2,600 ft)

Population (2004)
  - Total: 13,020

Shin (Arabic: شين Shîn) is a town in western Syria administratively part of the Homs Governorate, located west of Homs. Nearby localities include Rabah to the north, al-Mahfurah to the northeast, Tarin to the east, Suwayri to the southeast, Hadidah to the south, Mizyeneh and al-Huwash to the southwest and Muqlus to the northwest.

According to the Syria Central Bureau of Statistics (CBS), Shin had a population of 13,020 in the 2004 census. It is the administrative center of the Shin nahiyah ("subdistrict") which consists of 22 localities with a collective population of 27,951 in 2004. The inhabitants of the town are predominantly Sunnis and Alawites. Although many had converted to the heterodox Alawite sect of Sulayman al-Murshid (known as Murshidians) during the French Mandate period (1920–46), the population readopted the orthodox Alawite faith since then.

== Etymology ==
The name Shin is possibly coming from 2 sources Syriac language and it means the moon, and Aramaic language and it means peace

== History ==
The town has been built above an Arameans Khirbat (Town), and there are many other old Aramaians ruins. The majority of population used to work in agriculture, planting Olives, Wheat, Figs and Apples,
