= Homs District =

Homs District منطقة حمص
- District
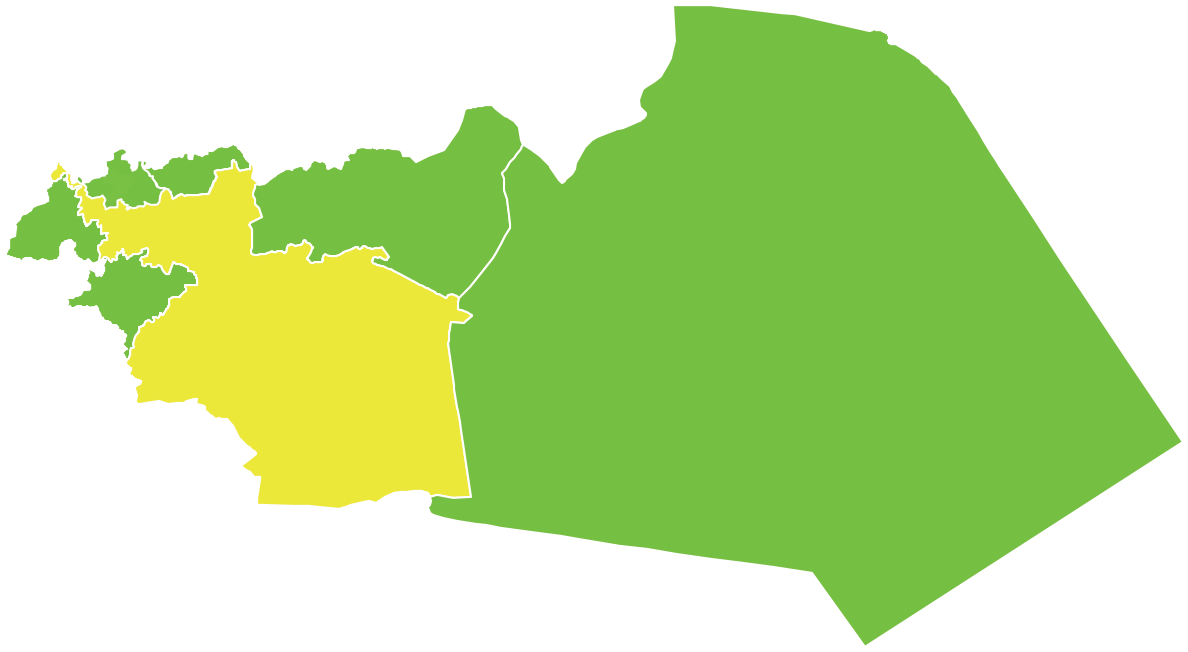
- Map of Homs District within Homs Governorate
- Coordinates (Homs): 34°43′51″N 36°42′34″E
- Country: Syria
- Governorate: Homs
- Seat: Homs
- Subdistricts: 10 nawāḥī

Area
  - Total: 7,758.92 km^{2} (2,995.74 sq mi)

Population (2004)
  - Total: 945,299
  - Density: 121.834/km^{2} (315.548/sq mi)
- Geocode: SY0401

Homs District (Arabic: منطقة حمص, romanized: manṭiqat Ḥimṣ) is a district of the Homs Governorate in central Syria. The administrative centre is the city of Homs.

The district was split in 2010, when three sub-districts were separated to form the new Taldou District. At the 2004 census, the remaining sub-districts had a total population of 945,299.

== Sub-districts ==
The district of Homs is divided into ten sub-districts or nawāḥī (population as of 2004):

- Homs Subdistrict (ناحية حمص): population 750,501.
- Khirbet Tin Nur Subdistrict (ناحية خربة تين نور): population 52,879.
- Ayn al-Niser Subdistrict (ناحية عين النسر): population 30,267.
- Furqlus Subdistrict (ناحية الفرقلس): population 13,506.
- Al-Riqama Subdistrict (ناحية رقاما): population 20,602.
- Al-Qaryatayn Subdistrict (ناحية القريتين): population 16,795.
- Mahin Subdistrict (ناحية مهين): population 13,511.
- Hisyah Subdistrict (ناحية حسياء): population 15,195.
- Sadad Subdistrict (ناحية صدد): population 4,092.
- Shin Subdistrict (ناحية شين): population 27,951.
