= Homs Governorate =

Homs Governorate مُحافظة حمص
- Governorate
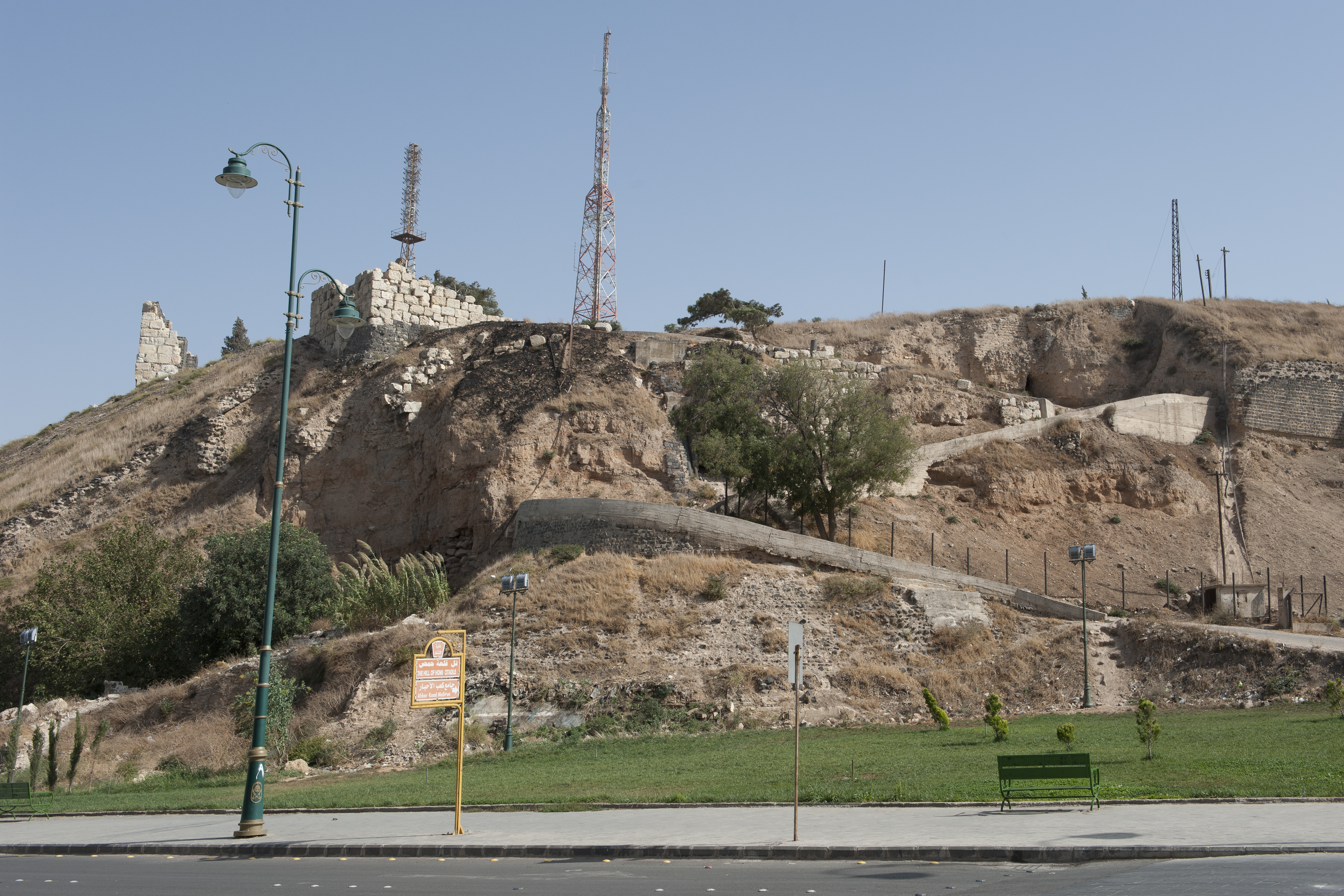
- Remains of the Citadel of Homs

- Seal

- Map of Syria with Homs highlighted
- Interactive map of Homs Governorate
- Coordinates (Homs): 34.3°N 38.3°E
- Country: Syria
- Capital: Homs
- Manatiq (Districts): 7

Government
  - Governor: Murhaf Khaled al-Naasan

Area
  - Total: 42,226 km^{2} (16,304 sq mi)

Population (2011)
  - Total: 1,803,000
  - Density: 42.70/km^{2} (110.6/sq mi)
- Time zone: UTC+3 (AST)
- ISO 3166 code: SY-HI
- Main language(s): Arabic
- Website: homsgov.sy

Homs Governorate (Arabic: مُحافظة حمص, romanized: Muḥāfaẓat Ḥimṣ) is one of the fourteen governorates of Syria. It is situated in central Syria. It has 42,226 km^{2} (16,304 sq mi).It is geographically the largest governorate in Syria. Homs Governorate has a population of 1,763,000 as of 2010. The Homs governorate is divided into six administrative districts (mantiqah), with the city of Homs as a separate district. Homs is the capital city of the district of Homs. Its governor is Namir Habib Makhlouf.

== History ==
A Homs Governorate also formed part of Ottoman Syria, when it was also known as the Sanjak of Homs.

During the Syrian civil war, the governorate witnessed several major military operations, including the Homs offensive of November–December 2015, which marked one of the key campaigns in the region.

== Districts ==
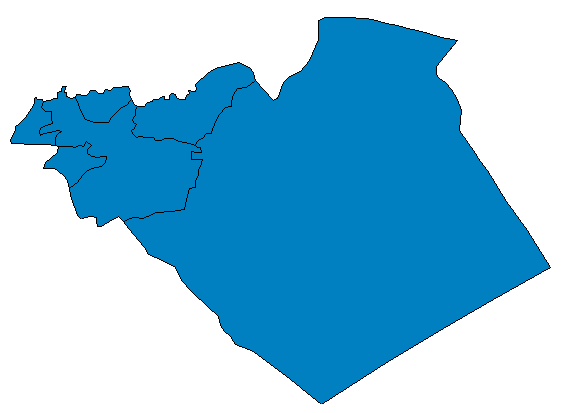

The governorate is divided into seven districts, known as manatiqs. The districts are further divided into 25 sub-districts, known as nawahis:

- Homs District (10 sub-districts)
  - Homs Subdistrict
  - Khirbet Tin Nur Subdistrict
  - Ayn al-Niser Subdistrict
  - Furqlus Subdistrict
  - Al-Riqama Subdistrict
  - Al-Qaryatayn Subdistrict
  - Mahin Subdistrict
  - Hisyah Subdistrict
  - Sadad Subdistrict
  - Shin Subdistrict
- Al-Mukharram District (2 sub-districts)
  - al-Mukharram Subdistrict
  - Jubb al-Jarrah Subdistrict
- Al-Rastan District (2 sub-districts)
  - al-Rastan Subdistrict
  - Talbiseh Subdistrict
- Al-Qusayr District (2 sub-districts)
  - Al-Qusayr Subdistrict
  - Al-Houz Subdistrict
- Palmyra District (2 sub-districts)
  - Palmyra Subdistrict
  - Al-Sukhnah Subdistrct
- Taldou District (3 sub-districts)^{*}
  - Taldou Subdistrict
  - Kafr Laha Subdistrict
  - Al-Qabu Subdistrict
- Talkalakh District (4 sub-districts)
  - Talkalakh Subdistrict
  - Hadidah Subdistrict
  - Al-Nasirah Subdistrict
  - Al-Hawash Subdistrict

^{*} - a newly-created district since 2010, formerly belonging to Homs District

== Demographics ==
Religious composition of Homs Governorate (2011)
| Sunnis | 64% |
| Alawites | 25% |
| Christians | 8% |
| Twelver Shias | 2% |
| Ismailis | 0.2% |

In late 2011, the population of Homs reached 1,803,000. This amounted to 8% of Syria’s total population. Sunni Muslims made up 64% of the governorate, while Alawite Muslims made up 25%, Christians made up 8%, Twelver Shia Muslims made up 2%, and Ismaili Muslims made up 0.2%.

== Notable people ==
- Joseph Atiyeh, silver medalist in Olympic wrestling, 1984 Summer Olympics
