= Wadi al-Nasara =

Wadi al-Nasara وادي الروم Κοιλάδα των Χριστιανών
- Village Cluster
- Location in Syria
- Coordinates: 34°46′N 36°16′E
- Country: Syria
- Governorate: Homs Governorate
- District: Talkalakh District

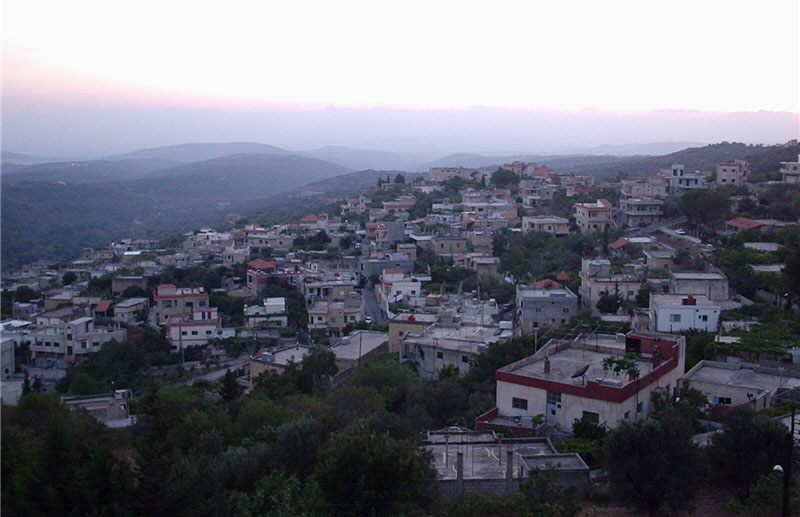
Zweitina Village

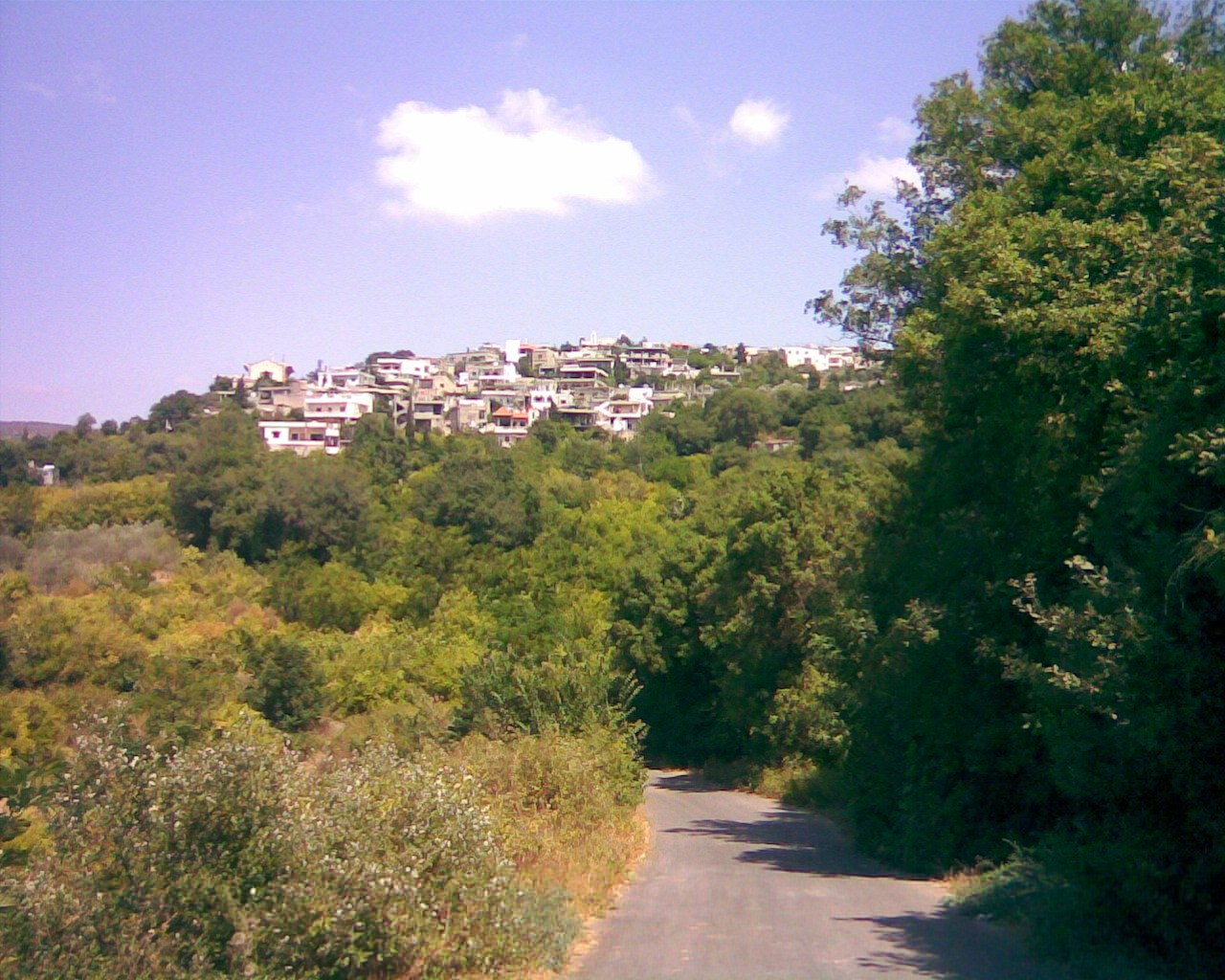
Mashta Azar Village

Wadi al-Nasara (Arabic: وادي النصارى / ALA-LC: Wādī an-Naṣārá "Valley of Christians") is an area in western Syria that administratively belongs to the governorate of Homs.

Most people in the area are Greek Orthodox Christians. It is ecclesiastically under the Archdiocese of Akkar, which has its seat in Cheikh Taba, Lebanon. The current Greek Orthodox Metropolitan of Akkar and Wadi al-Nasara and its dependencies (Safita and Tartus) is Basilius Mansour.

== Landmarks ==
Wadi al-Nasara was a popular tourist site before the outbreak of the Syrian civil war. Among its touristic attractions are the Saint George's Monastery located in the town of al-Mishtaya, the Krak des Chevaliers Crusader castle located in the village of al-Husn and the shrine of the Lady of the Valley in al-Nasira.

== Villages in the valley ==
- Anaz (Arabic: عناز)
- ِAltalleh/Al-Talla (Arabic: التلة)
- Al-Hawash (Arabic: الحواش)
- Mizyeneh (Arabic: المزينة)
- Ain al-Ajouz (Arabic: عين العجوز)
- al-Nasirah (Arabic: الناصرة)
- Kafra (Arabic: كفرا)
- Marmarita (Arabic: مرمريتا)
- al-Mishtaya (Arabic: المشتاية)
- Habnamrah (Arabic: حب نمرة)
- Ain al-Barda (Arabic: عين الباردة)
- Mashta Azar (Arabic: مشتى عازار)
- Ain al-Ghara (Arabic: عين الغارة)
- Qalatiyah (Arabic: القلاط)
- Zweitina (Arabic: الزويتينة)
- Bahzinah (Arabic: بحزينا)
- Ballat (Arabic: بلاط)
- Kimah (Arabic: كيمة)
- Tannurin (Arabic: تنورين)
- Daghlah (Arabic: دغلة)
- Jiwar al-Afas (Arabic: جوار العفص)
- Muklous (Arabic: مقلس)
- Kafr Ram (Arabic: كفرام)
- Rabah, Syria (Arabic: رباح)
- Amar al-Husn (Arabic: عمار الحصن)
- Juwaniyat (Arabic: جوانيات)
- Ain al-Raheb (Arabic: عين الراهب)
- Ish al-Shuha (Arabic: عش الشوحة)
- al-Muqaabarat (Arabic: مقعبرة)
- al-Mazraah (Arabic: مزرعة)
- Duwair al-Lin (Arabic: دوير اللين)
- Al-Husn (Arabic: الحصن)

== Notable people from Wadi al-Nasara ==
- Victor Atiyeh - American politician, former Governor of Oregon (father was from Al-Husn)
- Joseph Atiyeh - Olympic medalist, winner of Syria's first Olympic medal (born in Al-Husn)
- John X of Antioch - Greek Orthodox Patriarch of Antioch (father is from Marmarita)
- Yusuf Al-Khal - Lebanese-Syrian poet and journalist, pioneer of Arabic surrealist poetry (born in Al-Husn)
- Zerefeh Bashur - first licensed female physician in the Levant (born in Safita)

== See also ==
- Antiochian Greek Christians
- Greek Orthodox Church of Antioch
- Eastern Orthodoxy in Syria
