= Eastern Orthodoxy in Syria =

Syrian Greek Orthodox Christians الروم الأرثوذكس في سوريا
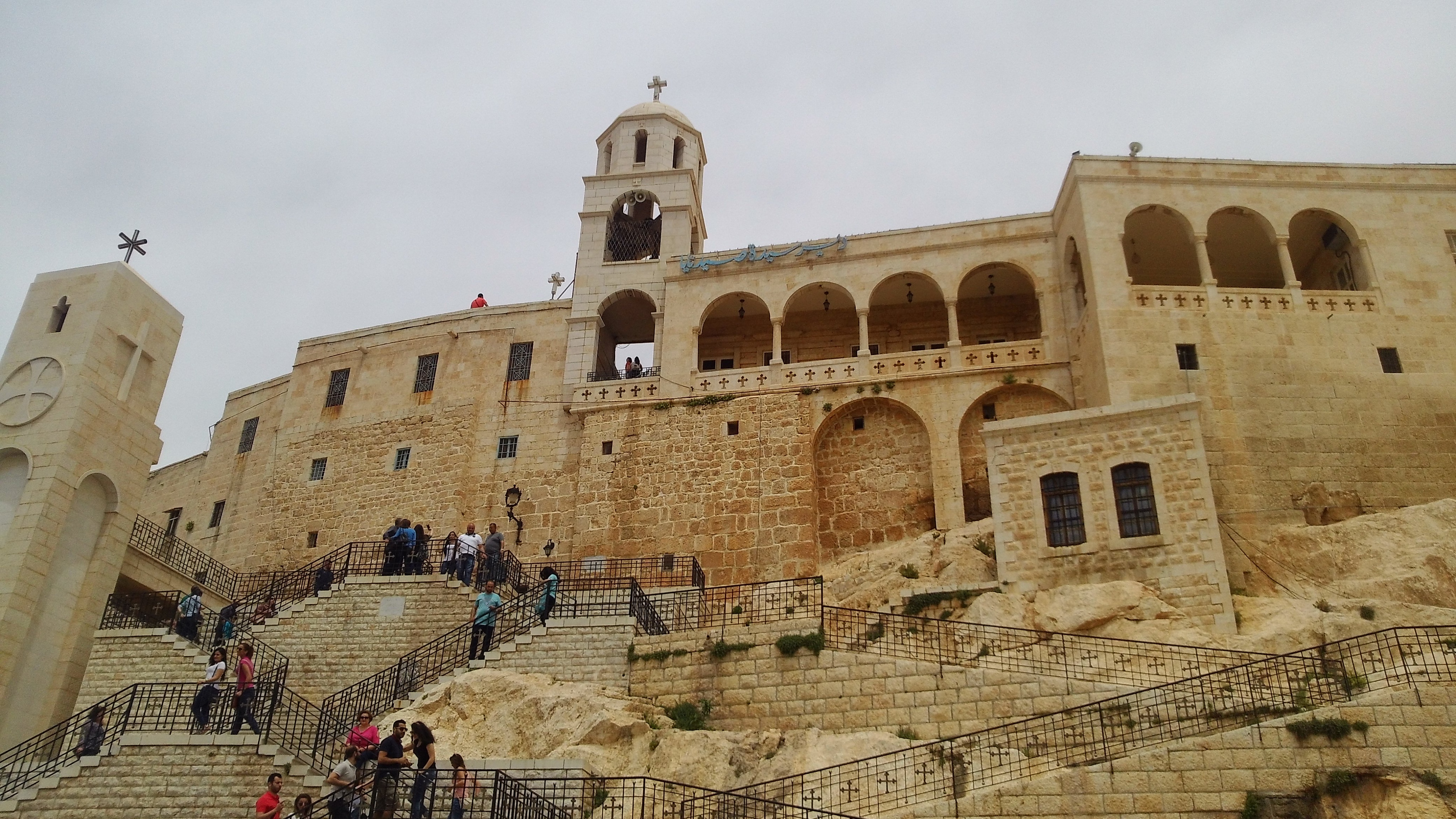
- Our Lady of Saidnaya Monastery, one of the oldest monasteries in the world

Total population
- 700,000–1,000,000

Religions
- Eastern Orthodox Christianity (Patriarchate of Antioch)

Languages
- Vernacular: Arabic; Liturgical: Koine Greek and Arabic

Eastern Orthodoxy in Syria represents Christians in Syria who are adherents of the Eastern Orthodox Church. The Eastern Orthodox tradition is represented in Syria by the Greek Orthodox Church of Antioch, (Note: In English translations of official documents, the Church of Antioch refers to itself as the Greek Orthodox Patriarchate of Antioch and All the East) the largest and oldest Christian community in the country.

== History ==
Eastern Orthodoxy in Syria originates from the early Christian community of Antioch, one of the most important centers of early Christianity. According to the New Testament, the disciples of Jesus were first called Christians in Antioch (Acts 11:26). The Apostles Peter and Paul are traditionally associated with the founding of the Antiochian Church, while early bishops such as Ignatius of Antioch played a central role in shaping early Christian identity and theology.

By the fourth and fifth centuries, Antioch was a major intellectual and ecclesiastical center of the Eastern Roman Empire. The First Council of Nicaea (325) and especially the Council of Chalcedon (451) defined the doctrinal framework of imperial Christianity. Following Chalcedon, the Church of Antioch experienced a lasting division between Chalcedonian and non-Chalcedonian communities. The Chalcedonian faction formed the historical basis of the later Greek Orthodox Patriarchate of Antioch, while the opposing group developed into separate bodies such as the Syriac Orthodox Church.

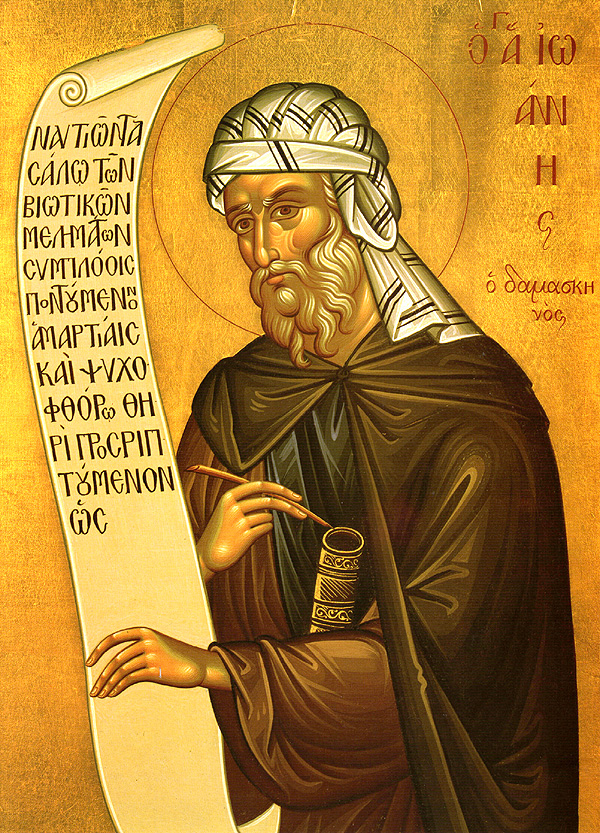
John of Damascus, most famous Syrian saint

Following the Muslim conquest of the Levant in the seventh century, Syria became part of the Umayyad Caliphate and later the Abbasid Caliphate. The Orthodox Christian population remained a distinct religious community and was commonly referred to as Rūm ("Romans"), reflecting its continuation of the Byzantine ecclesiastical tradition. Despite political subordination, the Antiochian Church preserved its hierarchy, liturgy, and identity under Islamic rule.

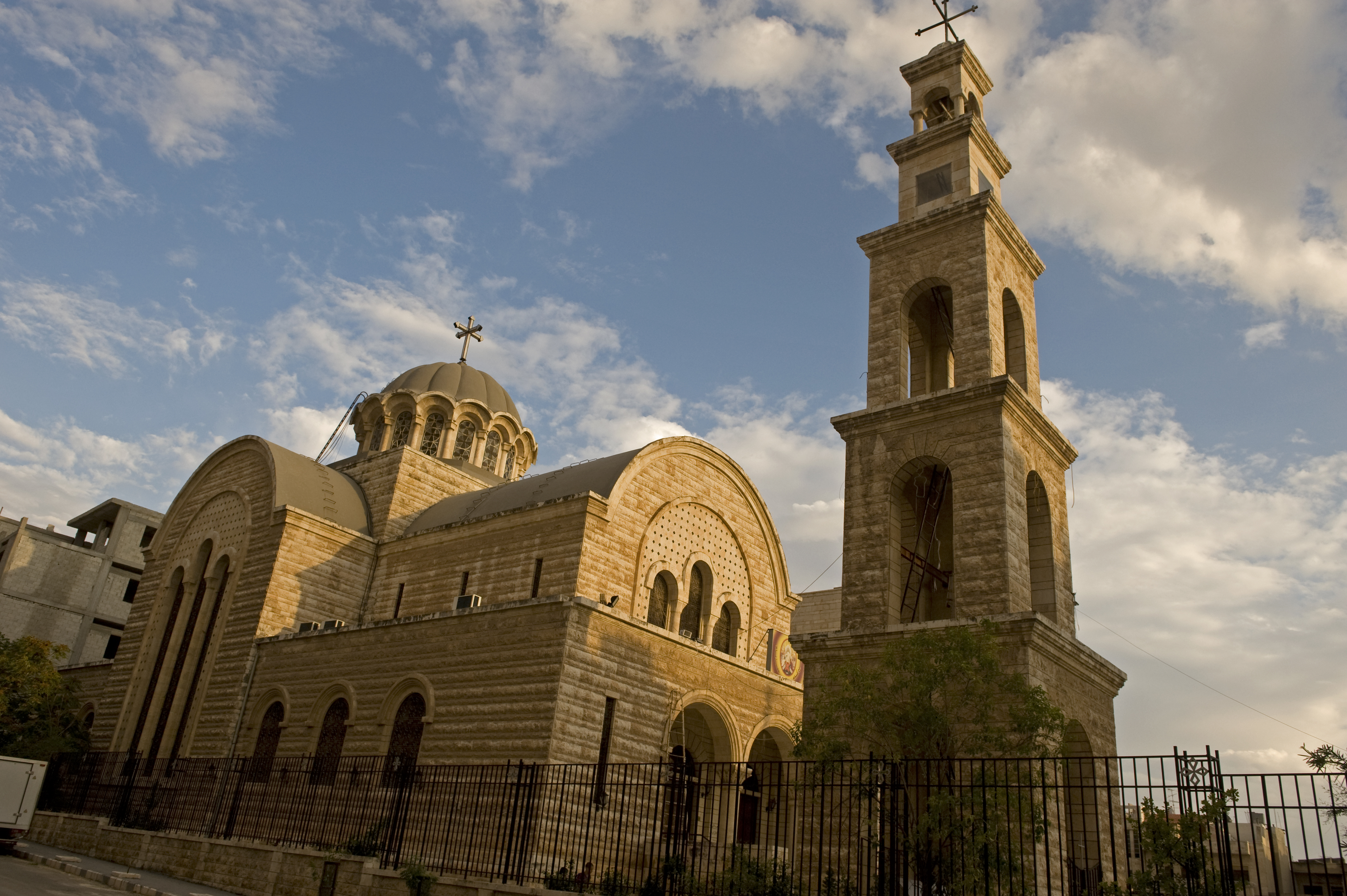
Saint George's Cathedral in Hama

During the Crusades, Syria became a contested frontier between Byzantine, Latin, and Muslim powers. The establishment of the Principality of Antioch led to periods of both cooperation and conflict between the local Orthodox population and the Latin Church hierarchy. The Orthodox patriarchate was intermittently displaced or subordinated under Latin control but continued to exist throughout the period in various forms.

In 1342, the patriarchal seat was transferred from Antioch to Damascus, where it remains today. Following the Ottoman conquest of Syria in 1517, the Orthodox Church was incorporated into the Rum Millet system under the authority of the Ecumenical Patriarchate of Constantinople. While the Ottoman period ensured institutional continuity, it also reinforced tensions between the predominantly Arab laity and the Greek-dominated hierarchy.

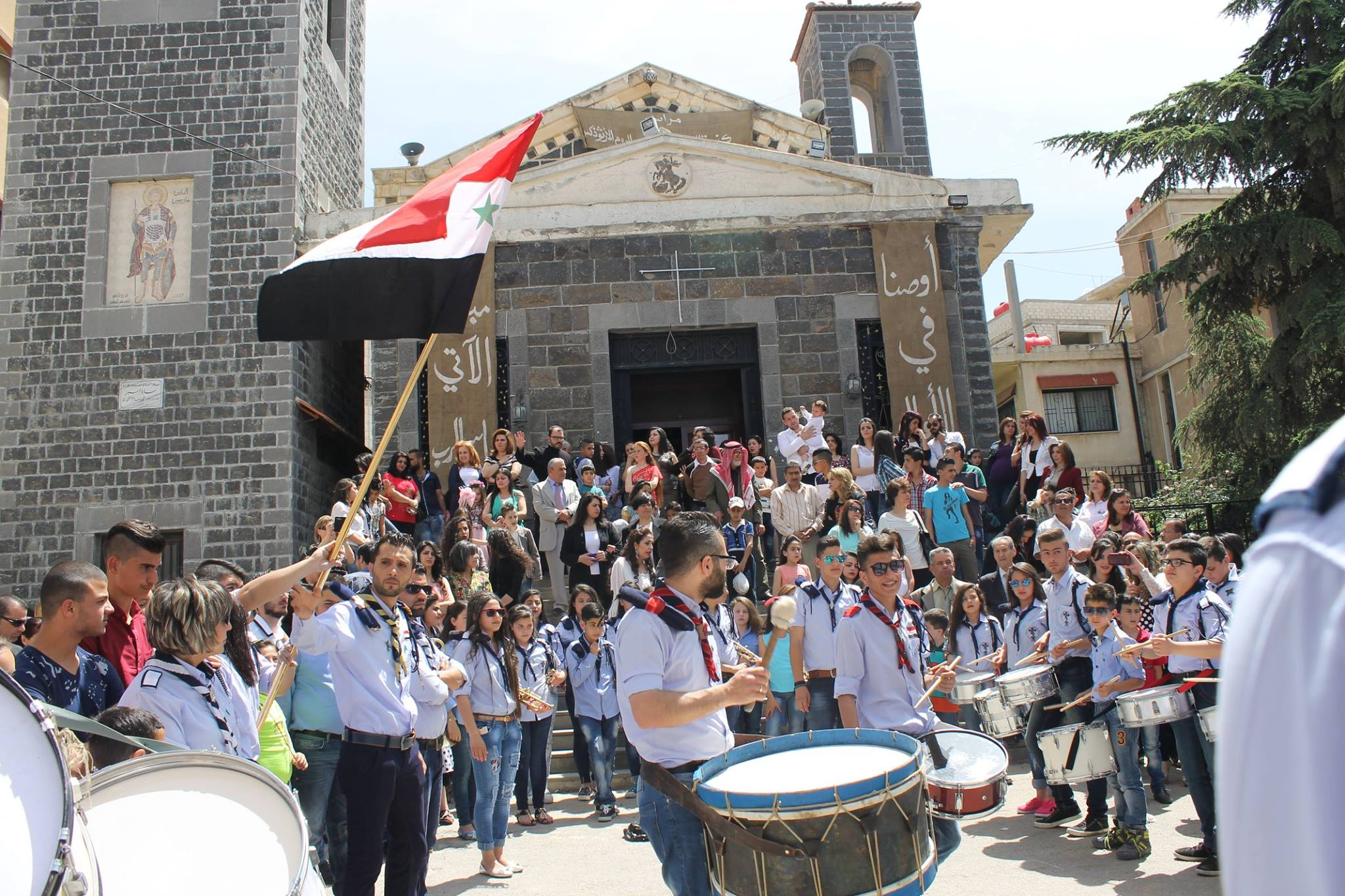
Orthodox Easter in As-Suwayda

In the nineteenth century, the Arab Orthodox Movement emerged within the Patriarchate of Antioch, advocating greater participation of Arab clergy and laity in church governance. This movement culminated in the election of Meletius II as Patriarch of Antioch in 1899, marking a decisive shift toward Arab leadership in the church.

During the twentieth century, under the French Mandate for Syria and the Lebanon and later independent Syria, the Greek Orthodox community became an influential component of Syrian intellectual and political life. Members of the community contributed significantly to the development of Arab nationalism and modern Syrian thought.

In modern Syria, the Greek Orthodox Patriarchate of Antioch remains the largest Christian denomination in the country, with its patriarchal seat in Damascus. Since the onset of the Syrian Civil War in 2011, Christian communities have experienced widespread displacement and emigration, with significant numbers leaving for Western countries.

Syrian Greek Orthodox Christians have a long and continuous association with Eastern Orthodox Churches in European countries such as Greece, Georgia, Cyprus, Russia, Ukraine, Bulgaria, Serbia, and Romania.

== Dual self-designation: "Melkites" and "Eastern Romans" ==
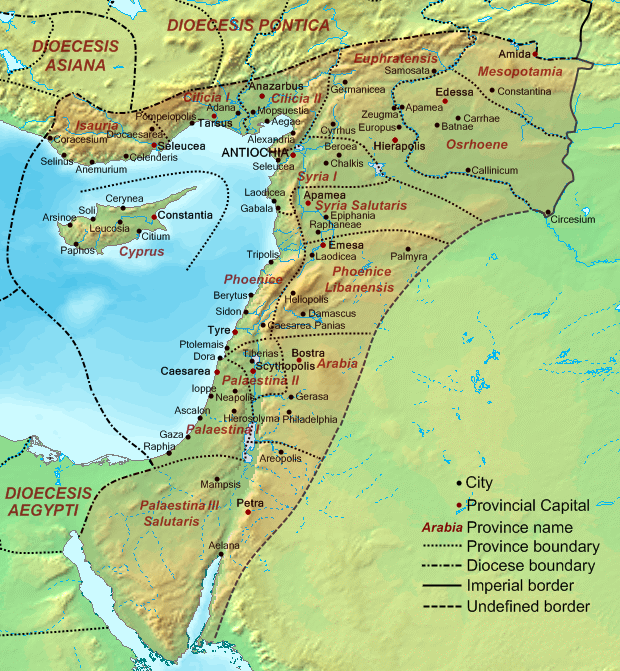
Map of the Diocese of the East 400 AD, homeland of the Christian Rūm; showing modern day Lebanon, Syria, Turkey, Israel, Palestine and Jordan

Members of the Eastern Orthodox Church or the Greek Catholic Rite in Syria and the Hatay province of Turkey (formerly part of Northern Syria), still call themselves Rūm which means "Eastern Romans" or "Asian Greeks" in Arabic, both referring to the Byzantine inheritance, and indeed they follow its central Greek-language version of the Constantinian or Byzantine Rite.

In that particular context, the term "Rūm" is used in preference to "Yūnāniyyūn" which means "European Greeks" in Classical Arabic (ultimately derived from the Ionians).

Members of these communities also call themselves "Melkites", which literally means "monarchists" or "supporters of the emperor" in Semitic languages (a reference to their ancient allegiance to Macedonian and Roman imperial rule), but, in the modern era, the term tends to be more commonly used by followers of the Greek Catholic Church of Antioch.

== Greek Orthodox Christian settlements ==
Antiochian Orthodox Christians are spread throughout Syria and have sizable populations in several cities and regions. The most important of these are:

Homs, Latakia, Tartus, Mhardeh, Al-Suqaylabiyah, Maten al-Sahel Kafr Buhum, Safita, Wadi al-Nasara, Al-Kafrun, Mashta al-Helu, Al-Mishtaya, Marmarita, Hawash, Rabah, Syria, Kafr Ram, Deir Mama, Al-Bayda, Ma'loula, Saidnaya, Al-Suwayda, Salkhad, Zweitina, Ayn al-Barda, Muklous, Uyun al-Wadi, and others.

== Notable Orthodox Christians in Syria ==
- Michel Aflak – Philosopher, founder of the secularist Baath party
- Dawoud Rajiha – Minister of Defense from 2011 to 2012
- Qustaki al-Himsi – Writer and poet of the Nahda movement
- Abd al-Masih Haddad – Writer of the Mahjar movement and journalist
- Constantin Zureiq – Longtime history professor at the American University of Beirut and proponent of secular Arab nationalism
- Halim Barakat – Arab novelist and sociologist
- George Wassouf – One of the most successful Arab singers selling over 60 million records worldwide
- Nassif Zeytoun – Singer and the 2010 winner of the Arabic reality television show Star Academy
- Nasib Arida – Poet and writer of the Mahjar movement and a founding member of the New York Pen League.
- Ignatius IV of Antioch – Patriarch of the Greek Orthodox Church of Antioch and All The East from 1979 to 2012
- John X of Antioch – Patriarch of the Greek Orthodox Church of Antioch and All The East since 2012
- Jules Jammal – Military officer and martyr for Syrian Nationalism
- Joseph Sweid – Minister of State since 2011 and a member of the Syrian Social Nationalist Party
- Mary Ajami – Feminist and pioneering Arabic-language writer

== See also ==
- Religion in Syria
- Christianity in Syria
- Roman Catholicism in Syria
- Demographics of Syria
- Freedom of religion in Syria
- Lebanese Greek Orthodox Christians
- Eastern Orthodoxy in Jordan
- University of Balamand

== Sources ==
- Brock, Sebastian P. (2011a). "Liturgy". Gorgias Encyclopedic Dictionary of the Syriac Heritage. Piscataway, NJ: Gorgias Press. pp. 248–251.
- Brock, Sebastian P. (2011b). "Melkite". Gorgias Encyclopedic Dictionary of the Syriac Heritage. Piscataway, NJ: Gorgias Press. p. 285.
- Brock, Sebastian P. (2011c). "Melkite literature in Syriac". Gorgias Encyclopedic Dictionary of the Syriac Heritage. Piscataway, NJ: Gorgias Press. pp. 285–286.
- Dick, Iganatios (2004). Melkites: Greek Orthodox and Greek Catholics of the Patriarchates of Antioch, Alexandria and Jerusalem. Roslindale, MA: Sophia Press. Archived from the original on 2023-06-08.
- Griffith, Sidney H. (2001). "Melkites, Jacobites and the Christological Controversies in Arabic in Third/Ninth-Century Syria". Syrian Christians under Islam: The First Thousand Years. Leiden: Brill. pp. 9–55. ISBN 9004120556.
- Griffith, Sidney H. (2008). "John of Damascus and the Church in Syria in the Umayyad Era: The Intellectual and Cultural Milieu of Orthodox Christians in the World of Islam" (PDF). Hugoye: Journal of Syriac Studies. 11 (2): 207–237. doi:10.31826/hug-2011-110111.
- Grillmeier, Aloys; Hainthaler, Theresia (2013). Christ in Christian Tradition: The Churches of Jerusalem and Antioch from 451 to 600. Vol. 2/3. Oxford: Oxford University Press. ISBN 978-0-19-921288-0.
- Hohmann, Gregory (2000). "Loyalty to the Emperor and Change of Rite: What Induced the Melkite Church to Exchange the Syrian for the Byzantine Tradition". The Harp. 13: 49–56. doi:10.31826/9781463233013-008. ISBN 9781463233013.
- Kiminas, Demetrius (2009). The Ecumenical Patriarchate: A History of Its Metropolitanates with Annotated Hierarch Catalogs. Wildside Press LLC. ISBN 9781434458766.
- Leonhardt, Christoph (2018). "The Greek- and the Syriac-Orthodox Patriarchates of Antioch in the Context of the Syrian Conflict" (PDF). Chronos: Revue d'Histoire de l'Université de Balamand. 33: 21–54. doi:10.31377/chr.v33i0.92. S2CID 54732620. Archived from the original (PDF) on 2019-03-09.
- Madey, John (1997). "The Rite of Notification and Acceptance of the Episcopal Election in the Melkite Orthodox Patriarchate of Antioch". The Harp. 10: 85–89. doi:10.31826/9781463232993-013. ISBN 9781463232993.
- Meyendorff, John (1989). Imperial unity and Christian divisions: The Church 450-680 A.D. Crestwood, NY: St. Vladimir's Seminary Press. ISBN 9780881410563.
- Ostrogorsky, George (1956). History of the Byzantine State. Oxford: Basil Blackwell.
- Panchenko, Constantin A. (2021). Orthodoxy and Islam in the Middle East: The Seventh to the Sixteenth Centuries. Jordanville, NY: Holy Trinity Publications. ISBN 9781942699330.
- Poujeau, Anna (2010). "Monasteries, Politics, and Social Memory: The Revival of the Greek Orthodox Church of Antioch in Syria during the Twentieth Century". Eastern Christians in Anthropological Perspective. Berkeley: University of California Press. pp. 177–192.
- Rompay, Lucas van (2008). "The East: Syria and Mesopotamia". The Oxford Handbook of Early Christian Studies. Oxford: Oxford University Press. pp. 365–386. ISBN 9780199271566.
- Roussos, Sotiris (1998). "Diplomacy and Communal Identity: Greece and the Greek Orthodox in Syria and Lebanon, 1919-1940". Chronos: Revue d'Histoire de l'Université de Balamand. 1: 33–65.
- Roussos, Sotiris (2009). "Diaspora Politics, Ethnicity and the Orthodox Church in the Near East". Journal of Eastern Christian Studies. 61 (1–2): 137–148. doi:10.2143/JECS.61.1.2045833.
- Roussos, Sotiris (2010). "Eastern Orthodox Christianity in the Middle East". Eastern Christianity in the Modern Middle East. London-New York: Routledge. pp. 107–119. ISBN 9781135193713.
- Roussos, Sotiris (2014). "Globalization Processes and Christians in the Middle East: A Comparative Analysis". The Journal of the Middle East and Africa. 5 (2): 111–130. doi:10.1080/21520844.2014.928924. S2CID 154336287.
- Walbiner, Carsten (1999). "Bishoprics and Bishops of the Greek Orthodox Patriarchate of Antioch in the 16th and 17th Centuries". تاريخ كنيسة أنطاكية للروم الأرثوذكس: أية خصوصية؟. طرابلس: منشورات جامعة البلمند. pp. 121–134.
- Walbiner, Carsten (2003). "The Split of the Greek Orthodox Patriarchate of Antioch (1724) and the Emergence of a New Identity in Bilâd al-Shâm as Reflected by some Melkite Historians of the 18th and Early 20th Centuries". Chronos: Revue d'Histoire de l'Université de Balamand. 7: 9–36.
- Winkler, Dietmar W. (2013). "Christianity in the Middle East: Some historical remarks and preliminary demographic figures". Syriac Christianity in the Middle East and India: Contributions and Challenges. Piscataway, NJ: Gorgias Press. pp. 107–125. doi:10.31826/9781463235864-011. ISBN 9781463235864.
