= Burj al-Arab, Syria =

Burj al-Arab برج العرب Ain al-'Arab
- Village
- Location in Syria
- Coordinates: 34°42′57″N 36°15′20″E
- Country: Syria
- Governorate: Homs
- District: Talkalakh
- Subdistrict: Talkalakh

Population (2004)
  - Total: 1,434
- Time zone: UTC+3 (EET)
  - Summer (DST): UTC+2 (EEST)

Burj al-Arab (Arabic: برج العرب, also known as Ain al-'Arab) is a village in northwestern Syria, administratively part of the Homs Governorate, located west of Homs and just north of Lebanon. Nearby localities include al-Tulay'i to the west, al-Sisiniyah to the northwest, al-Mitras to the north, Zweitinah to the northeast, Tell Hawsh to the east and Burj al-Maksur to the south. According to the Syria Central Bureau of Statistics (CBS), Burj al-Arab had a population of 1,434 in the 2004 census.

== Burj al-Arab tower ==
Burj al-Arab is the site of a tower by the same name which means the "Tower of the Arabs." It is a small medieval fortress built by the Crusaders in the early 12th century. It was captured by the Mamluk army under Sultan Baibars in 1271. The building is partially ruined and has been largely converted into a stable. The principal construction material used was basaltic stone. From the roof of the fortress, the medieval tower at al-Zarah and Talkalakh could be seen.
