= Al-Zarah =

Al-Zarah الزارة
- Village
- Location in Syria
- Coordinates: 34°42′57″N 36°15′20″E
- Country: Syria
- Governorate: Homs
- District: Talkalakh
- Subdistrict: Talkalakh

Population (2004)
  - Total: 4,336
- Time zone: UTC+3 (EET)
  - Summer (DST): UTC+2 (EEST)

Al-Zarah (Arabic: الزارة, romanized: al-Zārah, also spelled Zara) is a village in northwestern Syria, administratively part of the Homs Governorate, located west of Homs. Nearby localities include district center Talkalakh to the south, Aridah to the southeast, Hadidah to the east, al-Husn and Anaz to the northeast, Zweitinah to the north, Tell Hawsh to the northwest, Naarah to the west and Halat to the southwest.

According to the Syria Central Bureau of Statistics (CBS), al-Zarah had a population of 4,336 in the 2004 census. It is second largest locality in the Talkalakh nahiyah ("subdistrict") which consists of 40 localities with a collective population of 62,069 in 2004. The inhabitants of the town are predominantly Sunni Muslims.

== History ==
In 1838, al-Zarah's population was listed as Turkmen. It was one of a few Turkmen villages located in the mostly Alawite and Christian-populated area west of al-Husn.

== Burj Zara tower ==
Al-Zarah is the site of a medieval tower known as Burj Zahra, which in turn was built on the remains of a Roman era temple. It was constructed by the Crusaders in sometime during the early 12th century and is among several isolated towers located in the Homs Gap region of County of Tripoli. It served as a means of passive defense against the Muslim armies and was closely linked to the stronger, permanent fortresses of the Krak des Chevaliers, Safita, Margat and Tortosa. It was largely ignored by medieval Latin and Arabic chroniclers.

Burj Zara was built on a small podium with a ground plan of 121 square meters surrounded by greenery. The ruins of the ancient temple are strewn around the building. The tower itself was mostly constructed of basaltic rock, except for the edges of its doors and arches, which consist of white limestone that had probably been reused from the temple's remains. Only the northern wall is still standing and there are also remnants of the arches, the door and the steps of the stairway.

== Bibliography ==
- Robinson, E.; Smith, E. (1841). Biblical Researches in Palestine, Mount Sinai and Arabia Petraea: A Journal of Travels in the year 1838. Vol. 3. Boston: Crocker & Brewster.
- Steinsapir, Ann Irvine (2005). Rural Sanctuaries in Roman Syria: The Creation of a Sacred Landscape. John and Erica Hedges Ltd. ISBN 9781841717227.
