= Al-Mishtaya =

Village in northwestern Syria

Al-Mishtaya المشتاية
- Village
- Location in Syria
- Coordinates: 34°46′14″N 36°16′28″E
- Country: Syria
- Governorate: Homs
- District: Talkalakh
- Subdistrict: Nasirah

Population (2004)
  - Total: 1,002
- Time zone: UTC+3 (EET)
  - Summer (DST): UTC+2 (EEST)

Al-Mishtaya (Arabic: المشتاية) is a village in northwestern Syria, administratively part of the Homs Governorate, located west of Homs and north of the border with Lebanon. Nearby localities include al-Husn to the southeast, Zweitina to the west, Marmarita to the northwest and al-Nasirah to the north. According to the Syria Central Bureau of Statistics (CBS), al-Mishtaya had a population of 1,002 in the 2004 census. Its inhabitants are predominantly Greek Orthodox Christians.

Saint George's Monastery in Al-Mishtaya is considered one of the main tourist attraction in the region of Valley of Christians.

== See also ==
- Wadi al-Nasara
