= Qalatiyah =

Qalatiyah قلاطية
- Village
- Location in Syria
- Coordinates: 34°47′39″N 36°18′49″E
- Country: Syria
- Governorate: Homs
- District: Talkalakh
- Subdistrict: Nasirah

Population (2004)
  - Total: 724
- Time zone: UTC+2 (EET)
  - Summer (DST): +3

Qalatiyah (Arabic: قلاطية, also spelled Qlltia, Kilitia, or Kulleituliyeh) is a village in western Syria in the Wadi al-Nasara ("Valley of the Christians") and administratively belonging to the governorate of Homs. According to the Syria Central Bureau of Statistics, Qalatiyah had a population of 724 in the 2004 census.

Its inhabitants are predominantly Greek Orthodox Christians. The village has a Greek Orthodox Church.

== Bibliography ==
- Robinson, E.; Smith, E. (1841). Biblical Researches in Palestine, Mount Sinai and Arabia Petraea: A Journal of Travels in the year 1838. Vol. 3. Boston: Crocker & Brewster.
