= Qumayrah =

Qumayrah قميرة
- Village
- Location in Syria
- Coordinates: 34°43′19″N 36°16′42″E
- Country: Syria
- Governorate: Homs
- District: Talkalakh
- Subdistrict: Talkalakh

Population (2004)
  - Total: 310
- Time zone: UTC+2 (EET)
  - Summer (DST): +3

Qumayrah (Arabic: قميرة, also spelled Qmeiry or Qumairy) is a village in northern Syria located west of Homs in the Homs Governorate. According to the Syria Central Bureau of Statistics, Qumayrah had a population of 310 in the 2004 census. Its inhabitants are predominantly Alawites.

== Syrian Civil War ==
The village was the site of frequent clashes during the Syrian Civil War. On 12 July 2013, 11 people (including 4 civilians) were killed when rebel insurgents attacked the settlement. On 22 February 2014, 35 members of the Syrian armed forces were killed after the village was attacked by the Free Syrian Army.
