= Kafrish =

Kafrish كفريش
- Village
- Location in Syria
- Coordinates: 34°42′53″N 36°13′22″E
- Country: Syria
- Governorate: Homs
- District: Talkalakh
- Subdistrict: Talkalakh

Population (2004)
  - Total: 654
- Time zone: UTC+2 (EET)
  - Summer (DST): +3

Kafrish (Arabic: كفريش, also spelled Kafr Rish) is a village in northern Syria located northwest of Homs in the Homs Governorate. Its inhabitants are predominantly Alawites.

== Demographics ==
According to Syria's first official post-independence census of 1960, Kafrish at a population of 139. By the time of the 2004 census, its population had risen to 654.

== Bibliography ==
- Robinson, E.; Smith, E. (1841). Biblical Researches in Palestine, Mount Sinai and Arabia Petraea: A Journal of Travels in the year 1838. Vol. 3. Boston: Crocker & Brewster.
