= Mashta Azar =

Mashta Azar مشتى عازار
- Village
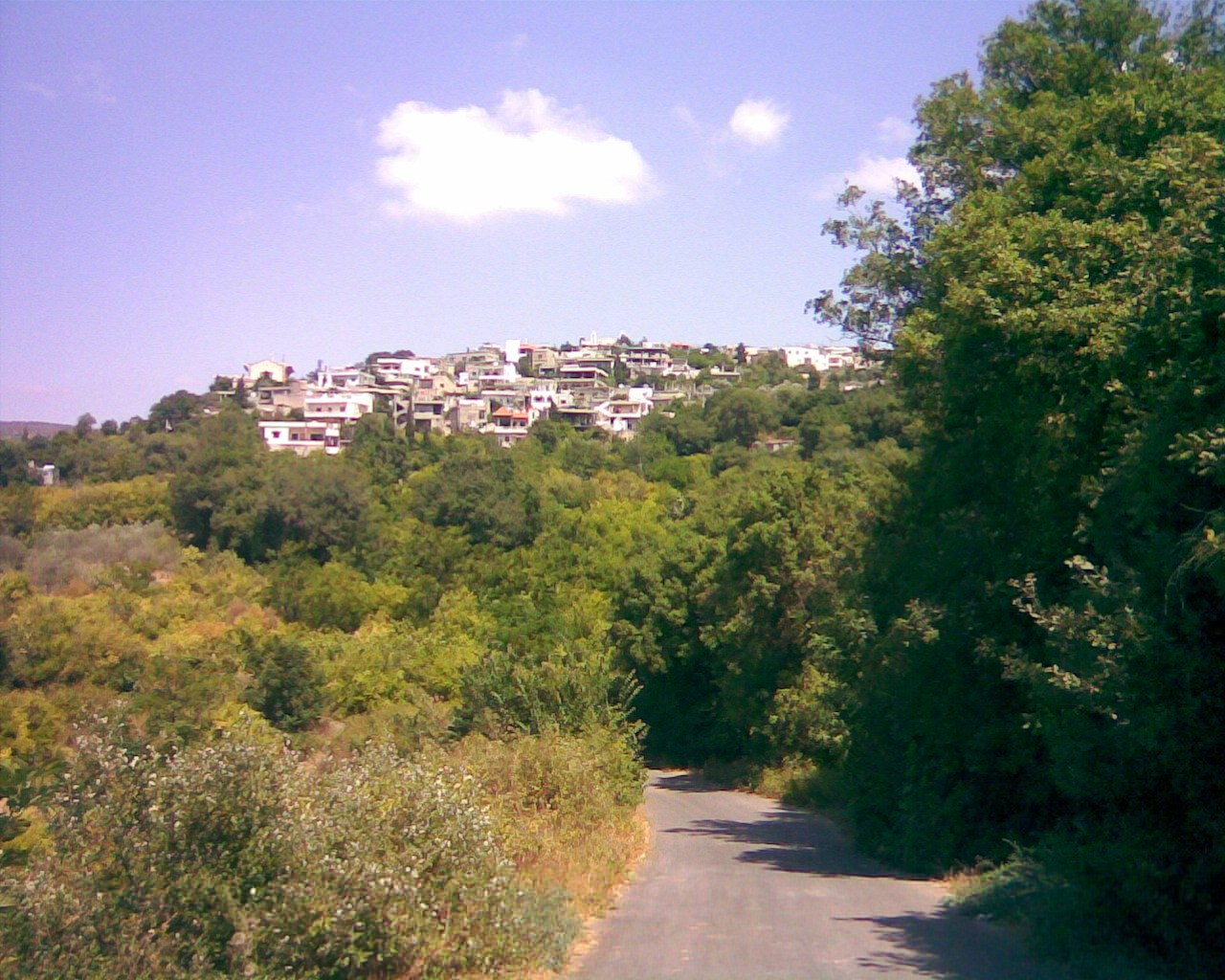

- Location in Syria
- Coordinates: 34°46′21″N 36°12′28″E
- Country: Syria
- Governorate: Homs
- District: Talkalakh
- Subdistrict: Nasirah

Population (2004)
  - Total: 783
- Time zone: UTC+3 (EET)
  - Summer (DST): UTC+2 (EEST)

Mashta Azar (Arabic: مشتى عازار) is a village in northwestern Syria, located west of Homs in the Wadi al-Nasarah valley, a region north of Talkalakh. According to the Syria Central Bureau of Statistics, Mashta Azar had a population of 783 in the 2004 census. Its inhabitants are predominantly Christians. The village has a Greek Orthodox Church and a Greek Catholic Church

It is a popular summer destination and tourist attraction in Syria.

== Bibliography ==
- Robinson, E.; Smith, E. (1841). Biblical Researches in Palestine, Mount Sinai and Arabia Petraea: A Journal of Travels in the year 1838. Vol. 3. Boston: Crocker & Brewster.
