= Hasrajiyah =

Hasrajiyah حصرجية Hasırciye
- Village
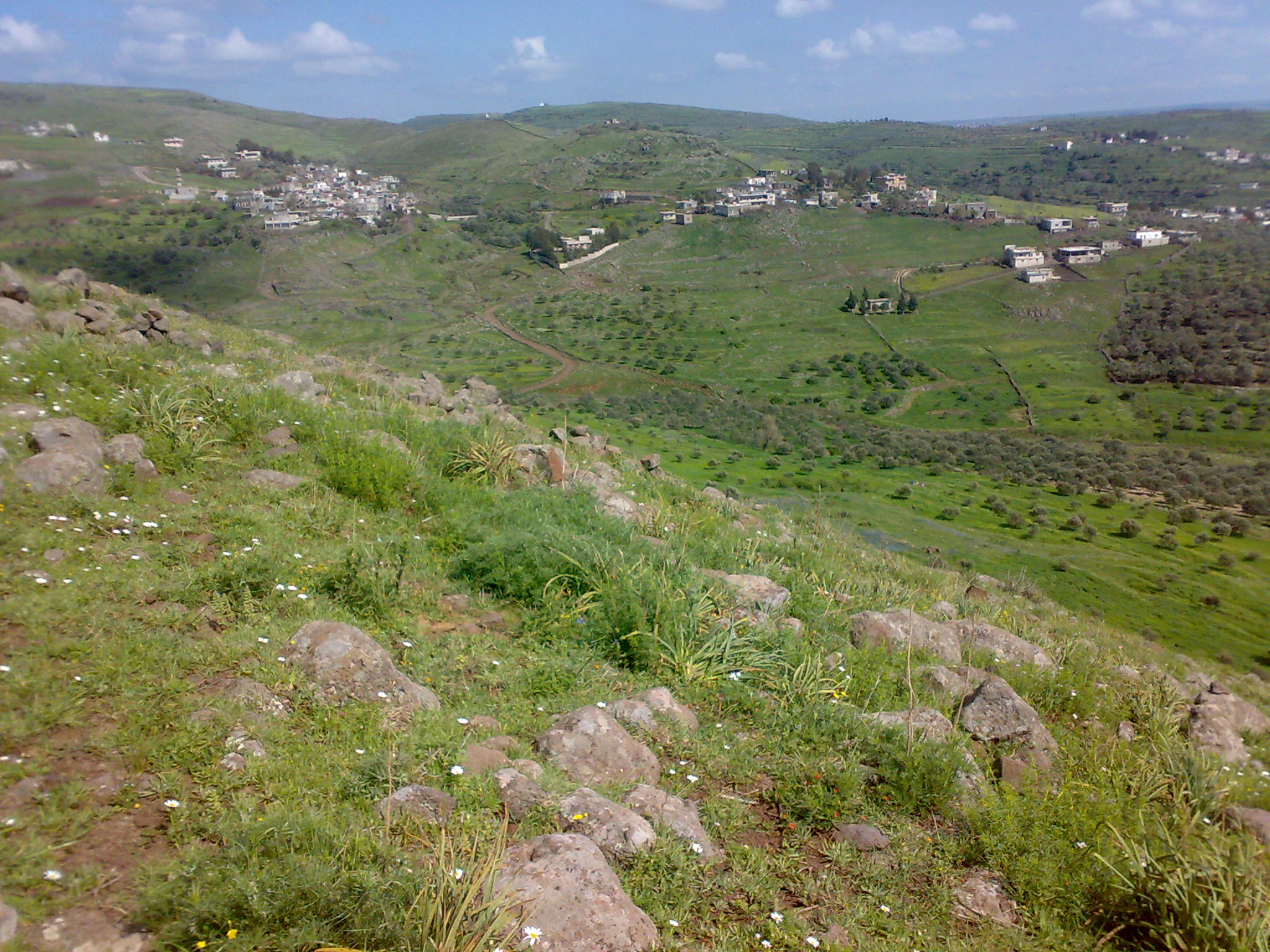
- A view of the village from 2009

- Location in Syria
- Coordinates: 34°43′36″N 36°15′22″E
- Country: Syria
- Governorate: Homs
- District: Talkalakh
- Subdistrict: Talkalakh

Population (2004)
  - Total: 519
- Time zone: UTC+2 (EET)
  - Summer (DST): +3

Hasrajiyah (Turkish: Hasırciye; Arabic: حصرجية, romanized: Hāsīrjīyyah, also spelled Hasrajieh) is a village in northern Syria located west of Homs in the Homs Governorate.

== Demographics ==
According to the Syria Central Bureau of Statistics, Hasrajiyah had a population of 519 in the 2004 census. Its inhabitants are predominantly Sunni Muslims. In 1838, its inhabitants were noted as being predominantly Turkmen.

== Bibliography ==
- Robinson, E.; Smith, E. (1841). Biblical Researches in Palestine, Mount Sinai and Arabia Petraea: A Journal of Travels in the year 1838. Vol. 3. Boston: Crocker & Brewster.
