= Qalih al-Saqa =

Qalih al-Saqa قلع السقا Qula, 'Ayn al-Mayla
- Village
- Location in Syria
- Coordinates: 34°45′2″N 36°22′37″E
- Country: Syria
- Governorate: Homs
- District: Talkalakh
- Subdistrict: Hawash

Population (2004)
  - Total: 340
- Time zone: UTC+2 (EET)
  - Summer (DST): +3

'Qalih al-Saqa (Arabic: قلع السقا, also known Qula or 'Ayn al-Mayla) is a village in northern Syria located west of Homs in the Homs Governorate. According to the Syria Central Bureau of Statistics, Qalih al-Saqa had a population of 340 in the 2004 census. Its inhabitants are predominantly Alawites.

== Bibliography ==
- Robinson, E.; Smith, E. (1841). Biblical Researches in Palestine, Mount Sinai and Arabia Petraea: A Journal of Travels in the year 1838. Vol. 3. Boston: Crocker & Brewster.
