= Zweitina =

Village in Syria

Zweitina زُويتينة
- Village
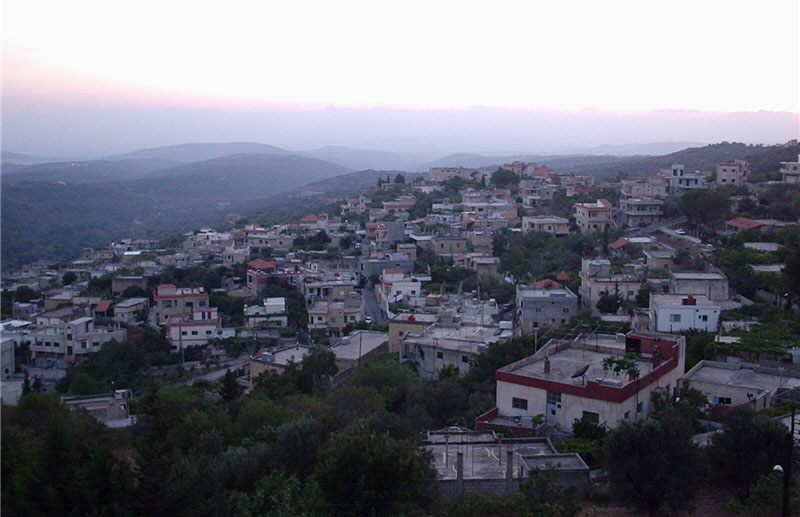
- View of Zweitina

- Location in Syria
- Coordinates: 34.76876°N 36.24883°E
- Country: Syria
- Governorate: Homs
- District: Talkalakh
- Subdistrict: Al-Nasirah
- Elevation: 420 m (1,380 ft)

Population
  - Total: 697
- Time zone: UTC+3 (EET)
  - Summer (DST): UTC+2 (EEST)

Zweitina or Zuwaytinah (Arabic: زُويتينة / ALA-LC: Zūwaytīnah) is a small Greek Orthodox Christian village located in Western Syria close to the Lebanese borders and administratively belonging to the Homs Governorate. Its location in the midst of a coniferous mountain makes it a popular and favored summer destination. Its altitude ranges between 400 and 450 meters. It is situated in the area known as Wadi al-Nasara ('valley of the Christians'). Nearby localities include Marmarita to the north, al-Huwash to the east, al-Huwash to the east, al-Husn to the southeast, al-Zarah to the south, Naarah and Tell Hawsh to the southwest, al-Mitras to the west and al-Bariqiyah to the northwest.

The al-Fawwar spring (Arabic: نبع الفوار), named so because it flows sporadically, lies within the village. The spring was called Sabte during the reign of the Roman emperor Titus in Syria. The village is also very close to the Krac des Chevaliers, or Qal'at al-Ḥiṣn. According to the Syria Central Bureau of Statistics (CNS), Zweitina had a population of 697 in the 2004 census. Its inhabitants are predominantly Christians. The village has a Greek Orthodox Church and a Greek Catholic Church.

== Etymology ==
The name Zweitina is derived from the word zeitoun which is Arabic for olive. Zweitina is Arabic for a single olive fruit. Olive trees dominate the forests of Zweitina and are considered the most important crops in the village which produces large amounts of olive product, thus justifying the name. Others argue that the name was derived from the Aramaic language and means "the land where silkworms grow" and refers to the silkworms which live and grow on berry trees found in the village's forests.

== Demographics ==
Zweitina has a fixed population during most of the year, but reaching approximately 5,000 inhabitants in summer. It is a village where Christianity dominates. Almost 75% of the original population live outside the village. The US state of Pennsylvania, is home to the largest diaspora of immigrants from the village, approximately 500 families. Zweitina is situated very close to the neighboring village of Marmarita, another Christian village.
