= Tannurin =

Tannurin تنورين
- Village
- Location in Syria
- Coordinates: 34°46′52″N 36°13′37″E
- Country: Syria
- Governorate: Homs
- District: Talkalakh
- Subdistrict: Al-Nasirah

Population (2004)
  - Total: 484
- Time zone: UTC+2 (EET)
  - Summer (DST): +3
- City Qrya Pcode: C2826

Tannurin (Arabic: تنورين) is a village in Syria in the Talkalakh District, Homs Governorate. It is situated in the area known as Wadi al-Nasara ('valley of the Christians'). According to the Syria Central Bureau of Statistics, Tannurin had a population of 484 in the 2004 census. Its inhabitants are predominantly Greek Orthodox and Greek Catholic Christians. The village has a Greek Orthodox church and a Greek Catholic church.
