= Al-Shuwayhid =

Al-Shuwayhid شواهد
- Village
- Location in Syria
- Coordinates: 34°44′16″N 36°16′17″E
- Country: Syria
- Governorate: Homs
- District: Talkalakh
- Subdistrict: Hawash

Population (2004)
  - Total: 654
- Time zone: UTC+2 (EET)
  - Summer (DST): +3

Al-Shuwayhid (Arabic: شواهد, also spelled al-Shuwaihed) is a village in northern Syria located west of Homs in the Homs Governorate. According to the Syria Central Bureau of Statistics, al-Shuwayhid had a population of 654 in the 2004 census. Its inhabitants are predominantly Sunni Muslims.
