= Burj al-Maksur =

Burj al-Maksur برج المكسور
- Village
- Location in Syria
- Coordinates: 34°41′42″N 36°10′28″E
- Country: Syria
- Governorate: Homs
- District: Talkalakh
- Subdistrict: Talkalakh

Population (2004)
  - Total: 1,579
- Time zone: UTC+2 (EET)
  - Summer (DST): +3

Burj al-Maksur (Arabic: برج المكسور) is a village in northern Syria located northwest of Homs in the Homs Governorate. According to the Syria Central Bureau of Statistics, Burj al-Maksur had a population of 1,579 in the 2004 census. Its inhabitants are predominantly Alawites.

== Bibliography ==
- Robinson, E.; Smith, E. (1841). Biblical Researches in Palestine, Mount Sinai and Arabia Petraea: A Journal of Travels in the year 1838. Vol. 3. Boston: Crocker & Brewster.
