= Ain al-Ajouz =

Ain al-Ajouz عين العجوز
- Village
- Location in Syria
- Coordinates: 34.7791340°N 36.3159444°E
- Country: Syria
- Governorate: Homs
- District: Talkalakh
- Subdistrict: Hawash

Population (2004)
  - Total: 436
- Time zone: UTC+2 (EET)
  - Summer (DST): +3

Ain al-Ajouz (Arabic: عين العجوز), formerly known as Besawme, is a village in northern Syria located west of Homs in the Homs Governorate. According to the Syria Central Bureau of Statistics, Ain al-Ajouz had a population of 436 in the 2004 census. Its inhabitants are predominantly Christians. The village has a Greek Orthodox Church.
