= Fuad Issa al-Jouni =

Syrian politician (born 1950)

Fuad Issa al-Jouni فؤاد عيسى الجوني

Minister of Industry
- In office 21 February 2006 – 29 March 2011
- President: Bashar al-Assad
- Prime Minister: Mohammad Najji Outri
- Preceded by: Ghassan Tayyarah
- Succeeded by: Adnan Slakho

Personal details
- Born: 1950 (age 75–76) Mashta Azar, Homs Governorate
- Party: Syrian Regional Branch of the Arab Socialist Ba'ath Party
- Education: University of Sheffield
- Profession: university professor

Fuad Issa al-Jouni (also Fouad; Arabic: فؤاد عيسى الجوني; born 1950) is a former Minister of Industry for Syria. He was previously a professor of mechanical engineering at the University of Aleppo. He holds a Ph.D. in metallurgy from the University of Sheffield in the United Kingdom.
