= Juwaniyat =

Juwaniyat جوانيات
- Village
- Location in Syria
- Coordinates: 34°47′53″N 36°20′33″E
- Country: Syria
- Governorate: Homs
- District: Talkalakh
- Subdistrict: Hawash

Population (2004)
  - Total: 366
- Time zone: UTC+2 (EET)
  - Summer (DST): +3

Juwaniyat (Arabic: جوانيات) is a village in northern Syria located west of Homs in the Homs Governorate. According to the Syria Central Bureau of Statistics, Juwaniyat had a population of 366 in the 2004 census. Its inhabitants are predominantly Christians. The village has a Greek Orthodox Church.

== Bibliography ==
- Robinson, E.; Smith, E. (1841). Biblical Researches in Palestine, Mount Sinai and Arabia Petraea: A Journal of Travels in the year 1838. Vol. 3. Boston: Crocker & Brewster.
