= Jiwar al-Afas =

Jiwar al-Afas جوار العفص
- Village
- Location in Syria
- Coordinates: 34°46′44″N 36°14′27″E
- Country: Syria
- Governorate: Homs
- District: Talkalakh
- Subdistrict: Nasirah

Population (2004)
  - Total: 385
- Time zone: UTC+2 (EET)
  - Summer (DST): +3

Jiwar al-Afas (Arabic: جوار العفص, also spelled Jewar al-Afs) is a village in northern Syria located west of Homs in the Homs Governorate. According to the Syria Central Bureau of Statistics, Jiwar al-Afas had a population of 385 in the 2004 census. Its inhabitants are predominantly Greek Orthodox and Greek Catholic Christians. The village has a Greek Orthodox Church and a Greek Catholic Church
