= Ain al-Raheb =

Ain al-Raheb عين الراهب
- Village
- Location in Syria
- Coordinates: 34.7719691°N 36.2422160°E
- Country: Syria
- Governorate: Homs
- District: Talkalakh
- Subdistrict: Nasirah

Population (2004)
  - Total: 349
- Time zone: UTC+2 (EET)
  - Summer (DST): +3

Ain al-Raheb (Arabic: عين الراهب) is a village in northern Syria located west of Homs in the Homs Governorate. According to the Syria Central Bureau of Statistics, Ain al-Raheb had a population of 349 in the 2004 census. Its inhabitants are predominantly Christians. The village has a Greek Orthodox Church and a Greek Catholic Church.
