= Ain al-Ghara =

Ain al-Ghara عين الغارة
- Village
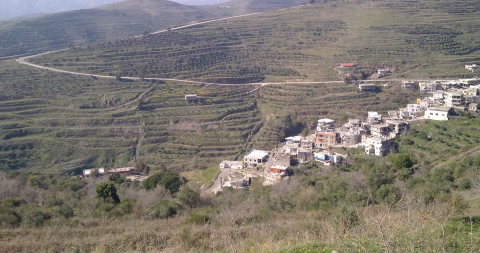

- Location in Syria
- Coordinates: 34.7868486°N 36.3701217°E
- Country: Syria
- Governorate: Homs
- District: Talkalakh
- Subdistrict: Hawash

Population (2004)
  - Total: 780
- Time zone: UTC+2 (EET)
  - Summer (DST): +3

Ain al-Ghara (Arabic: عين الغارة) is a village in northern Syria located west of Homs in the Homs Governorate. According to the Syria Central Bureau of Statistics, Ain al-Ghara had a population of 780 in the 2004 census. Its inhabitants are predominantly Christians. The village has a Greek Orthodox Church.
