= Habnamrah =

Habnamrah حبنمرة Habnemra
- Village
- Location in Syria
- Coordinates: 34°47′48″N 36°15′40″E
- Country: Syria
- Governorate: Homs
- District: Talkalakh
- Subdistrict: Nasirah

Population (2004)
  - Total: 2,110
- Time zone: UTC+2 (EET)
  - Summer (DST): +3
- City Qrya Pcode: C2827

Habnamrah (Arabic: حبنمرة, also spelled Habnemra) is a village in northern Syria located west of Homs in the Homs Governorate. It is situated in the area known as Wadi al-Nasara ('valley of the Christians'). According to the Syria Central Bureau of Statistics, Habnamrah had a population of 2,110 in the 2004 census. Its inhabitants are predominantly Greek Orthodox Christians. The village has a Greek Orthodox Church.

== Bibliography ==
- Robinson, E.; Smith, E. (1841). Biblical Researches in Palestine, Mount Sinai and Arabia Petraea: A Journal of Travels in the year 1838. Vol. 3. Boston: Crocker & Brewster.
