= Al-Fawwar spring =

Spring in Zweitina, Syria

Coordinates: 34°45′55″N 36°15′6″E

Al-Fawwar spring (Arabic: نبع الفوّار, Nab` al-Fawwar) is a spring found in northern Syria in a town called Zweitina, which is administratively belonging to the Homs Governorate.

It is one of the most important landmarks in the town because of its religious significance, as it is located near the Saint George Monastery. Al-Fawwar is basically a small grotto which is entered by going down a few steps where water is released from a few openings. The spring is known for flowing sporadically with random time intervals; the spring might not flow in days or even months. Loud sounds emitted from the underground would usually signal that the spring will flow and are heard minutes before the water starts flowing. The water would usually keep on flowing for a few hours, sometimes a day or two and the water would spread to smaller springs. This phenomenon is explainable and is said to be the result of the water at the opening trapping the air. Under high pressure the air pushes the water and causes this random strong flow of water. People regard this event as an auspicious sign that is to bring good luck and are always happy when this happens. The spring is surrounded with many restaurants, cafeterias and hotels. Thousands visit the Al-Fawwar spring every year, mainly tourists and visitors visiting the monastery.

This spring was called "Sabte" during the reign of the Roman emperor Titus in Syria.
