= Al-Nasirah =

Al-Nasirah may refer to:

- Nazareth, an Arab city in Israel called al-Nasirah in Arabic)
- al-Nasirah, Syria, a Christian village in Syria
