= Masyadah =

Masyadah مصيدة
- Village
- Location in Syria
- Coordinates: 34°42′3″N 36°11′50″E
- Country: Syria
- Governorate: Homs
- District: Talkalakh District
- Subdistrict: Talkalakh Subdistrict

Population (2004)
  - Total: 792
- Time zone: UTC+2 (EET)
  - Summer (DST): UTC+3 (EEST)
- City Qrya Pcode: C2791

Masyadah (Arabic: مصيدة) is a Syrian village located in Talkalakh District, Homs. According to the Syria Central Bureau of Statistics (CBS), Masyadah had a population of 792 in the 2004 census.
