= Al-Mazraah =

Syrian village

Al-Mazraah المزرعة
- Village
- Location in Syria
- Coordinates: 34°49′12″N 36°21′01″E
- Country: Syria
- Governorate: Homs
- District: Talkalakh
- Subdistrict: Hawash

Population (2004)
  - Total: 166
- Time zone: UTC+2 (EET)
  - Summer (DST): +3

Al-Mazraah (Arabic: المزرعة) is a village in northern Syria located west of Homs in the Homs Governorate. According to the Syria Central Bureau of Statistics, Al-Mazraah had a population of 166 in the 2004 census. Its inhabitants are predominantly Christians. The village has a Greek Orthodox Church and a Protestant Church.

== Bibliography ==
- Robinson, E.; Smith, E. (1841). Biblical Researches in Palestine, Mount Sinai and Arabia Petraea: A Journal of Travels in the year 1838. Vol. 3. Boston: Crocker & Brewster.
