= Kimah =

Kimah كيمة Keema, el-Keiyimeh
- Village
- Location in Syria
- Coordinates: 34°49′17″N 36°18′59″E
- Country: Syria
- Governorate: Homs
- District: Talkalakh
- Subdistrict: Nasirah

Population (2004)
  - Total: 508
- Time zone: UTC+2 (EET)
  - Summer (DST): +3

Kimah (Arabic: كيمة; also spelled Keema or Keiyimeh) is a village in northern Syria located west of Homs in the Homs Governorate. According to the Syria Central Bureau of Statistics, Kimah had a population of 508 in the 2004 census. Its inhabitants are predominantly Greek Orthodox Christians. The village has three Greek Orthodox Churches.

== Bibliography ==
- Robinson, E.; Smith, E. (1841). Biblical Researches in Palestine, Mount Sinai and Arabia Petraea: A Journal of Travels in the year 1838. Vol. 3. Boston: Crocker & Brewster.
