= Al-Husn, Homs =

Al-Hosn الحصن Al-Hisn
- City
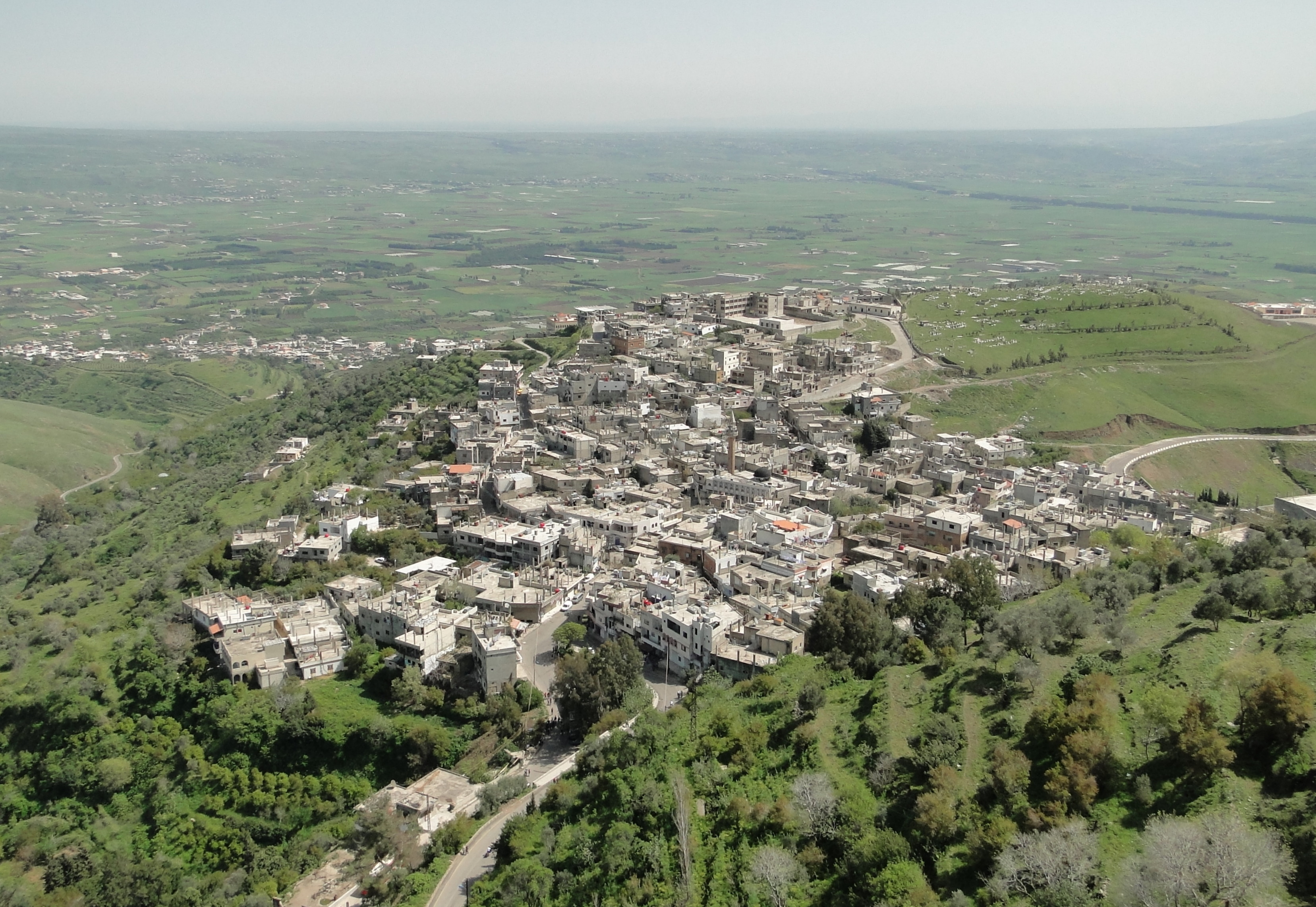
- The city of Al-Hosn seen from the southeast tower of Krak des Chevaliers

- Location in Syria
- Coordinates: 34°45′32″N 36°17′49″E
- Country: Syria
- Governorate: Homs
- District: Talkalakh
- Subdistrict: Hawash

Population (2004)
  - Total: 8,980
- Time zone: UTC+3 (EET)
  - Summer (DST): UTC+2 (EEST)

Al-Hosn (Arabic: الحصن, also spelled Al-Hisn) is a city in northwestern Syria, administratively part of the Homs Governorate. It is located west of Homs and north of the border with Lebanon. Nearby localities include al-Huwash to the east, Anaz to the southeast, Aridah to the south, al-Zarah to the southwest, Zweitina to the west, al-Nasirah and Marmarita to the northwest, Muqlus to the north, and Mazinah to the northeast.

According to the Syria Central Bureau of Statistics (CBS), Al-Hosn had a population of 8,980 in the 2004 census. It is the largest urban center in the al-Huwash nahiyah ("subdistrict"), which consisted of 19 localities with a collective population of 24,684 in 2004.

The inhabitants of the city are predominantly Sunni Muslims, with a significant Christian minority, and it lies within a region largely populated by Christians known as Wadi al-Nasara ("Valley of the Christians"). The city contains a Greek Catholic Church.

Al-Hosn is built around the Krak des Chevaliers fortress (known in Arabic as Qalʿat al-Hosn). The name Al-Hosn means "the Fortress." The modern city developed after the relocation of inhabitants from the fortress itself during French-led excavations. Subsequent growth occurred with limited urban planning, resulting in significant urban sprawl surrounding the fortress.

In 2014, Al-Hosn was the site of a major battle during the Syrian Civil War.

== Bibliography ==
- Darke, Diane (2006). Syria. Bradt Travel Guides. ISBN 1841621625.
- Robinson, E.; Smith, E. (1841). Biblical Researches in Palestine, Mount Sinai and Arabia Petraea. Vol. 3. Crocker & Brewster.

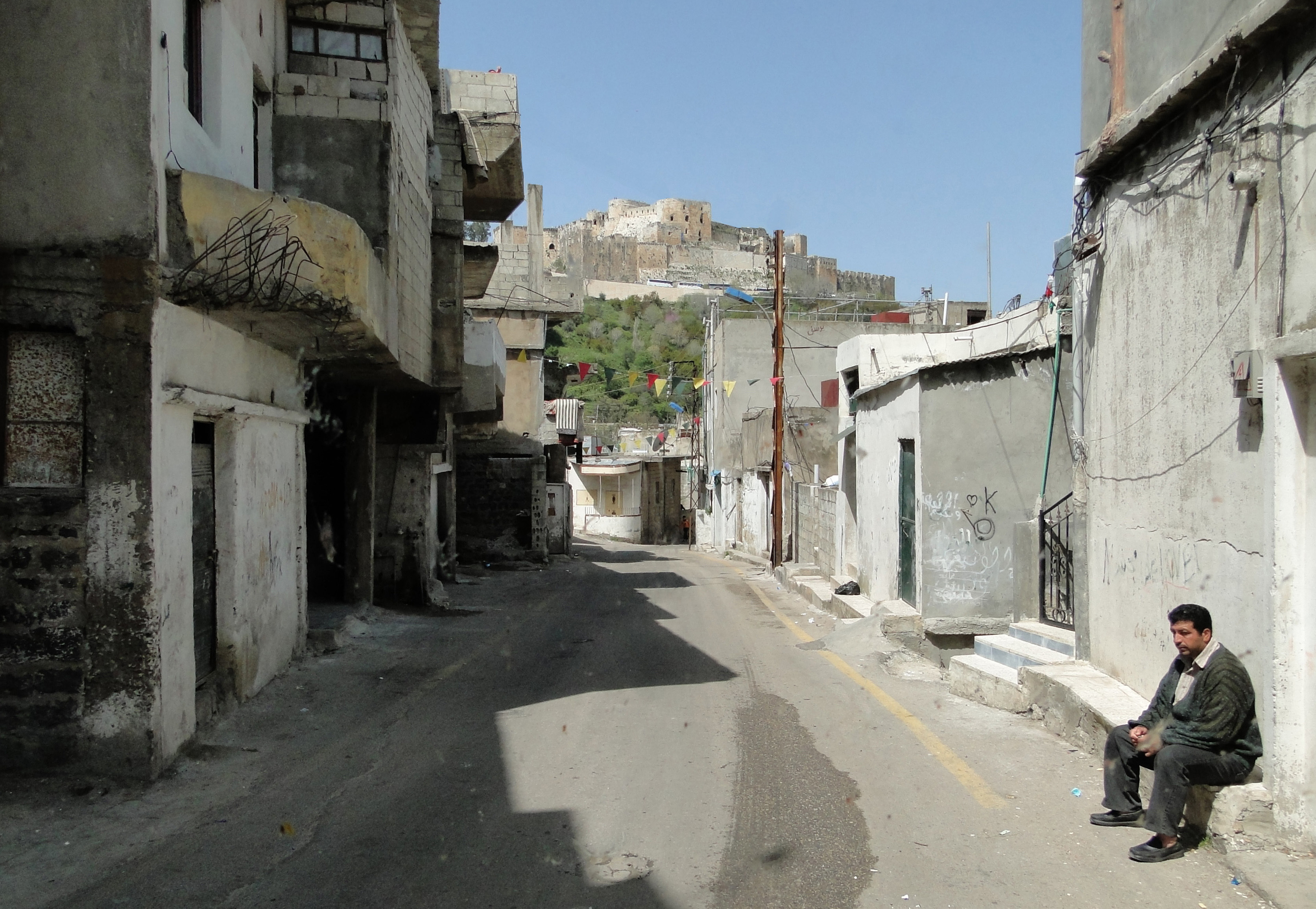
An alley in Al-Hosn with a view of the fortress
