= Borg El Arab (disambiguation) =

Borg El Arab is a city located in Alexandria Governorate.

Borg El Arab (Arabic: برج العرب) may also refer to:

- New Borg El Arab, is a new Egyptian city of the first generation, located in Alexandria Governorate
- Borg El Arab Markaz, is an Egyptian municipal in Alexandria Governorate.
- Borg El Arab Stadium, is a stadium commissioned in 2005 west of Alexandria, Egypt
- Borg El Arab Technological University, is a national, non-profit Egyptian university.
- Burj al-Arab, Syria, is a village in northwestern Syria
- Borg El Arab, Lebanon, is a village in Akkar District, Lebanon
- Burj Al Arab, is a luxury hotel located in the city of Dubai, United Arab Emirates
