= Bahzinah =

Bahzinah بحزينا
- Village
- Location in Syria
- Coordinates: 34°45′5″N 36°12′27″E
- Country: Syria
- Governorate: Homs
- District: Talkalakh
- Subdistrict: Nasirah

Population (2004)
  - Total: 586
- Time zone: UTC+2 (EET)
  - Summer (DST): +3

Bahzinah (Arabic: بحزينا, also spelled Bahzina) is a village in northern Syria located west of Homs in the Homs Governorate. According to the Syria Central Bureau of Statistics, Bahzinah had a population of 586 in the 2004 census. Its inhabitants are predominantly Christians. The village has a Greek Orthodox Church and a Greek Catholic Church.

== Bibliography ==
- Robinson, E.; Smith, E. (1841). Biblical Researches in Palestine, Mount Sinai and Arabia Petraea: A Journal of Travels in the year 1838. Vol. 3. Boston: Crocker & Brewster.
