= Ain al-Barda =

Village in Syria

Ain al-Barda عين الباردة
- Village
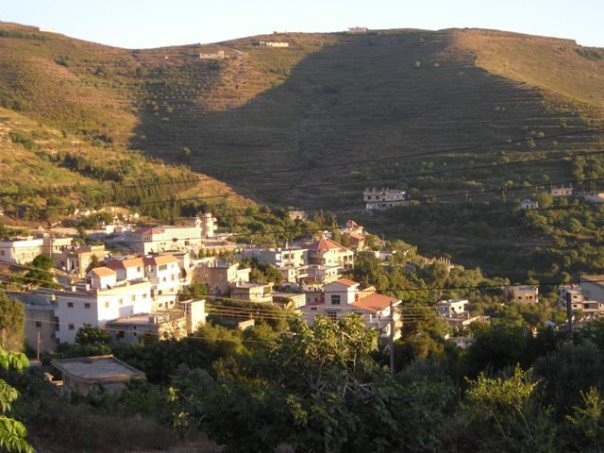

- Location in Syria
- Coordinates: 34°47′48″N 36°16′58″E
- Country: Syria
- Governorate: Homs
- District: Talkalakh
- Subdistrict: Nasirah
- Elevation: 2,790 ft (850 m)
- Time zone: UTC+3 (EET)
  - Summer (DST): UTC+2 (EEST)
- Website: AinAlbardeh.com

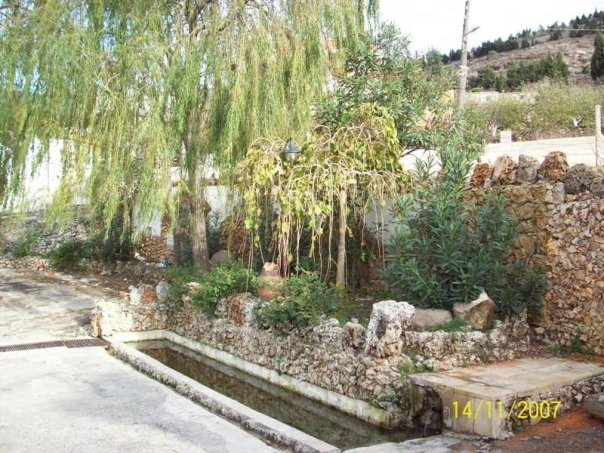
Al-`Ayn (the spring)

Ain al-Barda (Arabic: عين الباردة; ALA-LC: ‘Ayn al-Bārdah, which means "cold spring") is a village in Syria, located 55 kilometres west of Homs and 200 kilometres northwest of Damascus. Nestled on the Sayeh mountain, at 850 metres above sea level, the village overlooks the Wadi al-Nasara valley. Its inhabitants are predominantly Greek Orthodox Christians. The village has a Greek Orthodox Church.

== Geography ==
=== Climate ===
Ain al-Barda has a Mediterranean climate. It snows on the mountain slopes several times in winter.

== Main sights ==
The village is a common stopover for tourists on their way to the nearby Krak des Chevaliers; most of them visit the church of Saint Elias in the village. John Gardiner Kinnear described the village in an account of his journey throughout the Middle East in 1839:

Last week T—— and I rode up to a beautiful secluded spot, some three or four hours from Beyrout [sic]. It is, as the Arabic name implies, a fountain of delightfully cold water, which, issuing in copious stream from the rocks, is received into a stone basin under the shade of a magnificent carob-tree. There is no village near it; but within a short distance are one or two lonely cottages among the vineyards and mulberry gardens. It is on the upmost verge of the cultivated part of the mountain; below are gardens and pine woods; and above, the wild rocks and pine woods; and above, the wild rocks and tangled shrubbery. The air is clear, cool, and refreshing after the sultry atmosphere of Beyrout; and the view over the lower heights covered with vines and olives mingling with the dark pine woods, to the wide expanse of the blue Mediterranean, is one of the most beautiful I ever beheld.

== Bibliography ==
- Robinson, E.; Smith, E. (1841). Biblical Researches in Palestine, Mount Sinai and Arabia Petraea: A Journal of Travels in the year 1838. Vol. 3. Boston: Crocker & Brewster.
