= Jules Jammal =

Syrian military officer

- جول يوسف جمال

Jules Yusuf Jammal (Arabic: جول يوسف جمال) is said to have been a Syrian military officer who killed himself in a suicide attack during the Suez Crisis, in Egypt.

According to a narrative prevailing in the Arab world, Jammal rammed his boat into a French warship, thereby sinking the ship. This story is given credence in some sources. However, as related in the 1967 book Six days in June: Israel's fight for survival by Washington correspondent and historian Robert J. Donovan, the tale is false but gained traction in the Arab world after being aired on Radio Cairo. It is cited as an example of the "potency of [the station] to propagate myths [as being] beyond dispute."

== Narrative ==
According to sources from Arab countries, Jammal's biography and actions are the following: He was born in al-Mishtaya, a village located between Homs and Latakia, into an Arab Orthodox Christian family. He later joined the Syrian Navy as an officer. During the 1956 Suez Crisis, he is said to have volunteered in the name of Arab nationalism to launch a suicide bomb attack against the tripartite invasion by Israel, the UK and France into the Sinai Peninsula in order to capture the Suez Canal. Jammal activated a suicide bomb when he rammed his boat into a French ship, destroying it and dying in the process.

It is unclear which ship he is supposed to have sunk. One source calls the ship at issue the "liner Jean D’Arc" and another the "French warship, Jeanne D’Arc". There was a French cruiser Jeanne d'Arc in service at that time, but it was decommissioned in 1964 rather than sunk. Some sources name the battleship Jean Bart, which did see action in the Suez Canal, but that vessel was also not sunk; it was decommissioned in 1961.

== Legacy ==
A 1960 film called The Giants of the Sea (in Arabic: عمالقة البحر pronounced "Amaliqat el Bahr") was released, directed by Al Sayyed Badir and starring Ahmed Mazhar, Abdel Monhem Ibrahim and Nadia Lutfi. Jules was played by his brother, Adel Jammal.

Arab film director Gassan Abdullah announced plans to make a film about Jammal in 2008, since he was regarded as a hero for many in Syria and Egypt for his Arab nationalism.

The Grand Mufti of Syria, Ahmad Badreddin Hassoun, mentioned Jammal in a speech aimed at Western countries, warning that Syrians and Lebanese would engage in suicide bomb attacks against Europe and the United States if they bombed Syria during the 2011 Syrian uprising. He cited Jammal as an example of a non-Muslim Syrian who carried out a suicide bomb martyrdom attack on the west, and warned that non-Muslims would assist Syria in those attacks.
