= Saint George's Monastery, Homs =

Saint George's Monastery دير مار جرجس
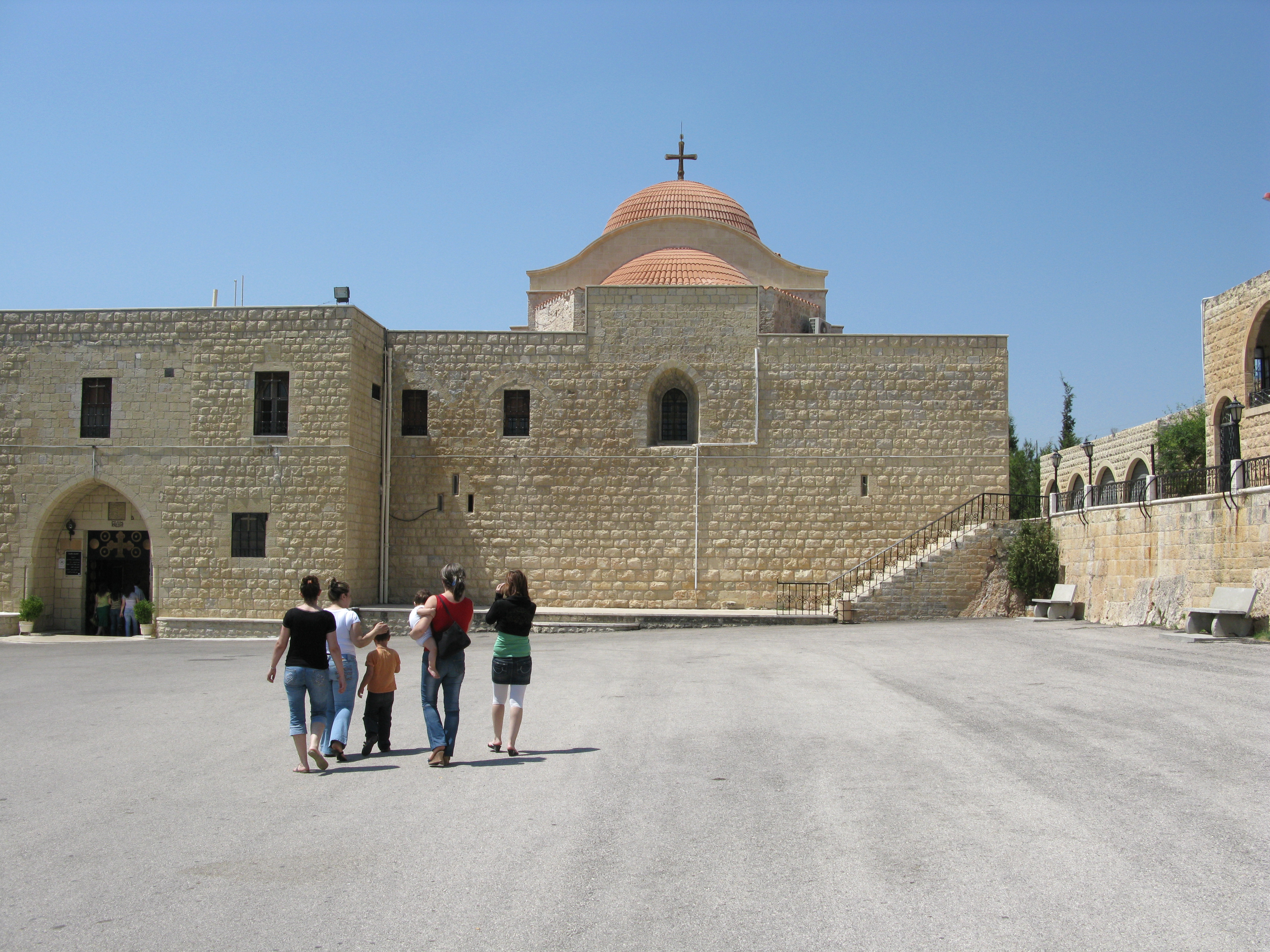

- Location within Syria

Monastery information
- Established: 5th century
- Dedication: Saint George
- Diocese: Antioch

Site
- Location: Meshtaye, Talkalakh District, Homs Governorate, Syria
- Coordinates: 34°46′2″N 36°16′5″E
- Public access: Yes

Saint George's Monastery (Arabic: دير مار جرجس, romanized: Deir Mār Jirjis) is a historic Greek Orthodox monastery in the village of al-Mishtaya in the Valley of the Christians in north-western Syria. The monastery is located just a few kilometers north of the Krak des Chevaliers, a famous Crusader-era castle.

John X, the current Orthodox Patriarch of Antioch, was abbot of the monastery from 1995 to 2002, and played a significant role in its revitalization.

== History ==
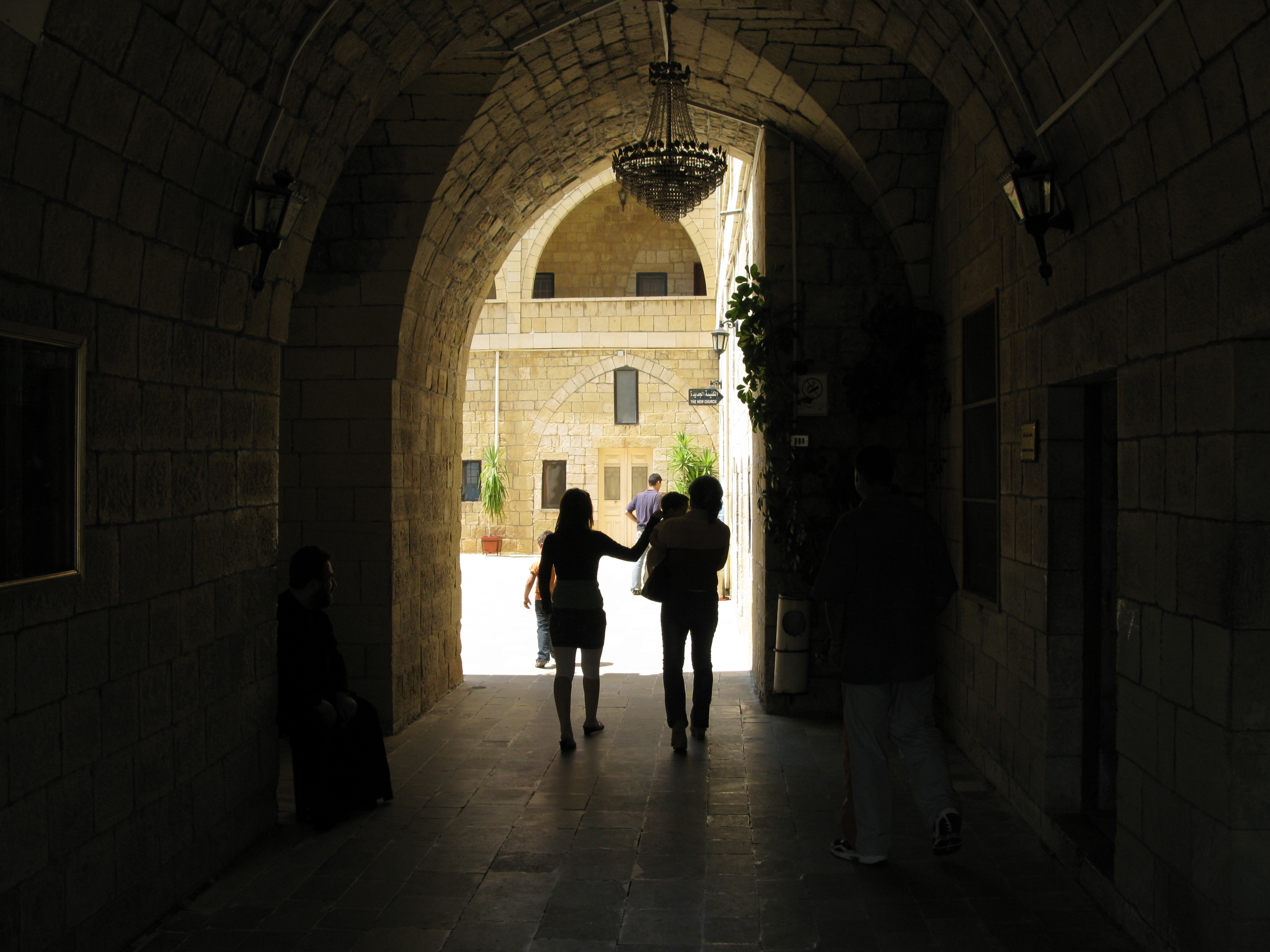
Entrance to Saint George's Monastery.

It is said that Saint George's monastery was built over the remains of an ancient temple of a god, Humaira, possibly from the Greek homoiros, by the Eastern Roman Emperor Justinian I sometime in the 6th century. The monastery occupies a 6,000 m^{2} land and was built entirely from Byzantine styled stone.

The modern church was rebuilt in 1857. Most of the older monastery's items are preserved and displayed in the monastery. Its entrance features a triple arch and two central supporting columns in the Eastern Roman style. A large, historic stone with religious carvings can be found in the monastery's southern gate. The wooden iconostases found inside the church are decorated with impressive carvings and are magnificent presentations of art, its gold painted icons depict various scenes from the life of Christ. Beneath the monastery's main courtyard there is an older 13th century chapel with a smaller iconostasis, older than 300 years. Its icons depict scenes from the life of Saint George, a popular saint among Christians in the Middle East. At this lower level, there is also an entrance to what is believed to be the original 6th century monastery and several large amphorae. The monastery also displays many other ancient items like crosses, writings, books, carvings, goblets, and other tools. It is also home to a manuscript written by the caliph Umar ibn al-Khattab, which discussed the relationships between Muslims and Christians.

The monastery is busiest during pilgrimages at the feast of Saint George (May 6) and the feast of the elevation of the Holy Cross (September 14).

In 2013, during the Syrian civil war, Islamic gunmen attacked the monastery but were driven off by volunteers of the People's Defense Forces at the cost of the lives of eleven defenders.

== See also ==
- Saint George: Devotions, traditions and prayers
