= Lady of the Valley =

Marian shrine in Syria

Coordinates: 34.788756°N 36.276042°E

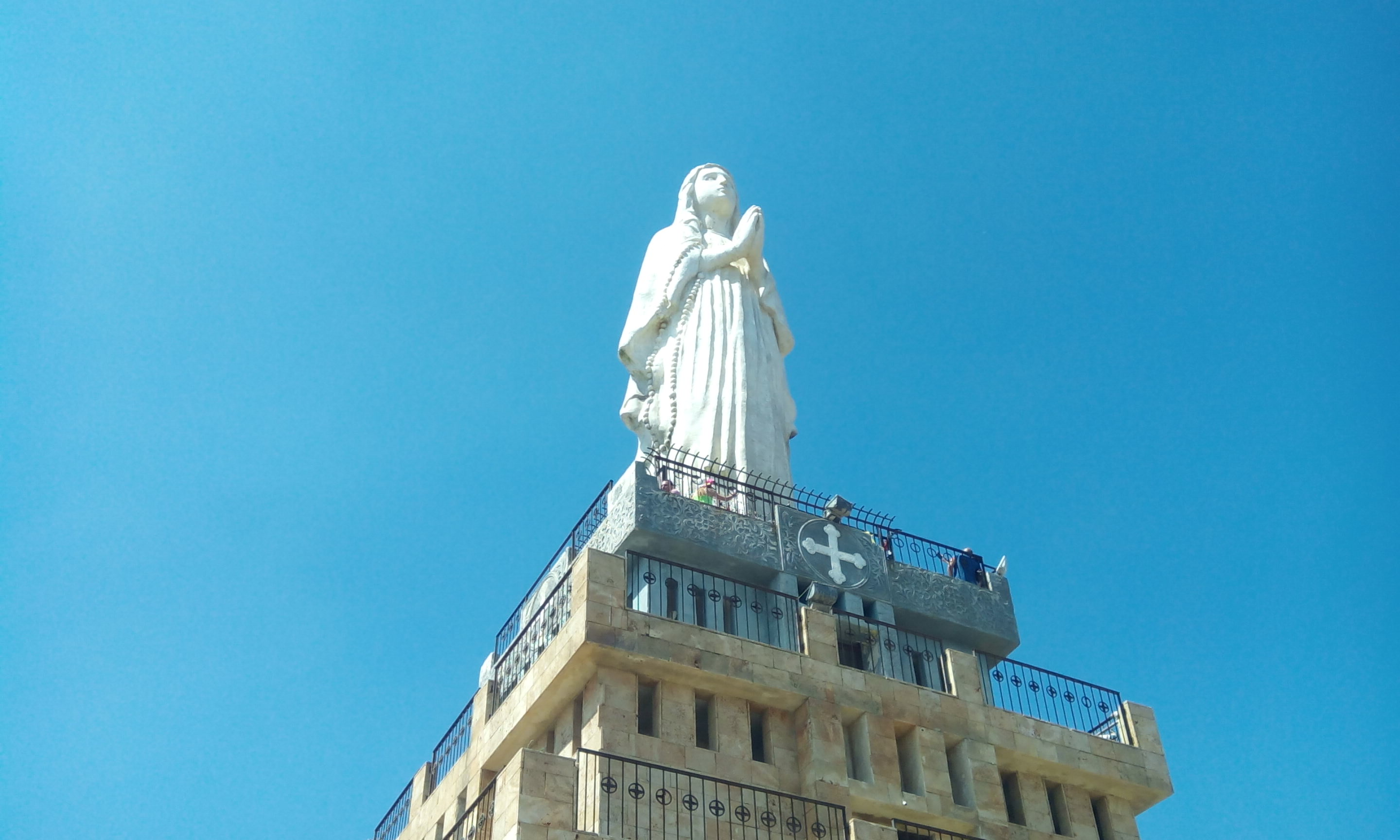
The shrine in 2016.

The Lady of the Valley (Arabic: سيدة الوادي, Sayyidat al-Wadi) is a Marian shrine inaugurated on 16 August 2009, located in Al-Nasirah, Wadi al-Nasara in Syria. The statue is built near the Lady of the Valley Church on top of Mount of the Pilgrim (Arabic: جبل السائح, romanized: Jabal al-Sayeh), which is dedicated to Saint George.

The figure which stands on a base that brings its height to 30 metres (98 ft), at an altitude of 980 metres (3215 ft) above sea level; completed on 16 August 2009.

== See also ==
- Convent of Our Lady of Saidnaya
- Shrines to the Virgin Mary
