= Anaz =

Anaz عناز
- Village
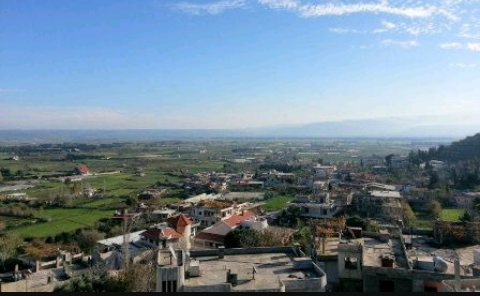
- Anaz, 2017

- Location in Syria
- Coordinates: 34°44′33″N 36°18′58″E
- Country: Syria
- Governorate: Homs
- District: Talkalakh
- Subdistrict: Hawash

Population (2004)
  - Total: 2,038
- Time zone: UTC+2 (EET)
  - Summer (DST): +3

Anaz (Arabic: عناز, also spelled Aanaz) is a village in northern Syria located west of Homs in the Homs Governorate. According to the Syria Central Bureau of Statistics, Anaz had a population of 2,038 in the 2004 census. Its inhabitants are predominantly Christians. The village has a Greek Orthodox Church and a Greek Catholic Church.

== Bibliography ==
- Robinson, E.; Smith, E. (1841). Biblical Researches in Palestine, Mount Sinai and Arabia Petraea: A Journal of Travels in the year 1838. Vol. 3. Boston: Crocker & Brewster.
