= John X of Antioch =

Patriarch of Antioch

His Beatitude John X Yazigi يوحنا العاشر يازجي
- Greek Orthodox Patriarch of Antioch and All the East
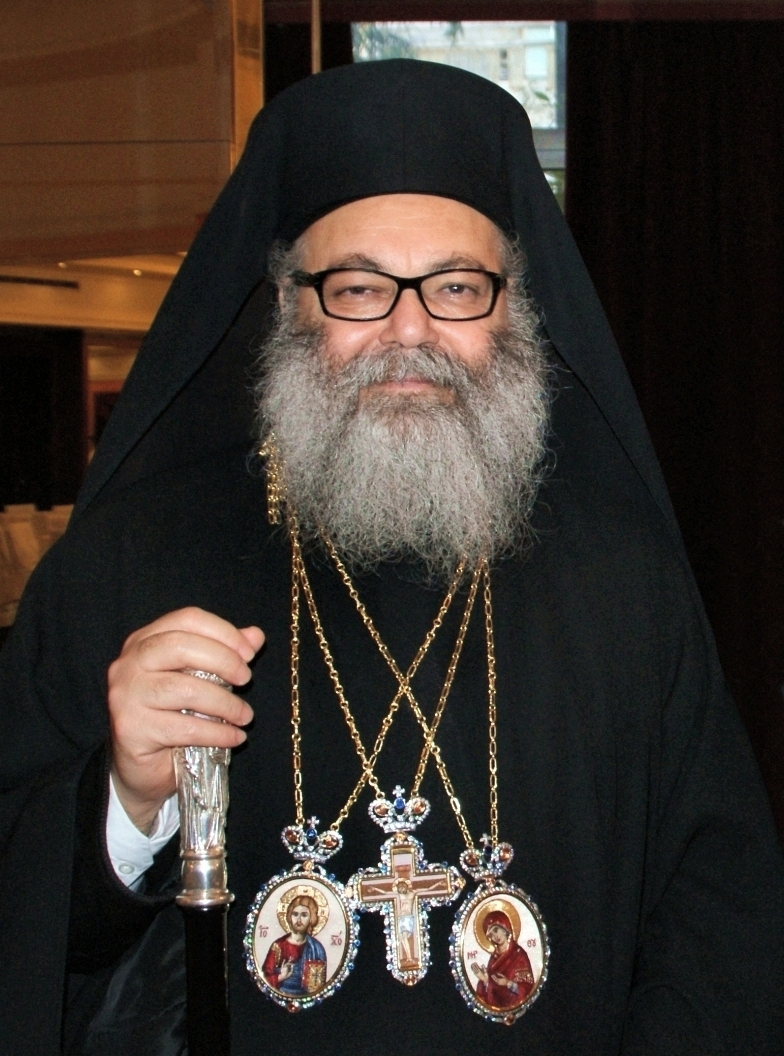
- John X in 2013
- Church: Greek Orthodox Church of Antioch
- See: Antioch
- Elected: December 17, 2012
- Installed: February 10, 2013
- Predecessor: Ignatius IV of Antioch
- Previous posts: Bishop of Al-Husn (1995–2008); Metropolitan of (Central and Western) Europe (2008–2012)

Orders
- Ordination: 1983
- Consecration: 24 January 1995

Personal details
- Born: Hani Yazigi; January 1, 1955 (age 71) Latakia, Second Syrian Republic
- Residence: Mariamite Cathedral of Damascus, Syria; Balamand Monastery, Lebanon
- Education: Latakia University; University of Balamand; Aristotle University of Thessaloniki

Patriarch John X (Arabic: البطريرك يوحنا العاشر al-Baṭriyark Yūḥannā al-ʿĀšir; born Hānī Yāzijī هاني يازجي; January 1, 1955) is primate of the Greek Orthodox Patriarchate of Antioch and All The East.

== Life ==
Hani Yaziji, a Greek Orthodox Christian, was born in Latakia, Syria. His Syrian Arab father, Mounah Yaziji, was a poet and Arabic language teacher, and his Lebanese mother, Rosa Moussi is from Tripoli, Lebanon. His brother is metropolitan Paul (Yaziji), who was the metropolitan of Aleppo until his abduction by Wahhabi fundamentalists in 2013. He graduated from Tishreen University with a degree in civil engineering, then he earned a degree in theology in 1978 from the Saint John of Damascus Institute of Theology at the University of Balamand. In 1983, he graduated from the theological faculty of the Aristotle University of Thessaloniki with a focus in liturgics. He also has a degree in Byzantine music from the Conservatory of Byzantine Music of Thessaloniki.

== Ordination and episcopacy ==
He was ordained to the diaconate in 1979 and the priesthood in 1983. On January 24, 1995, he was consecrated as the vicar bishop of Al-Husn. After his consecration, Bishop John immediately began to work to revive the patriarchal monastery of St. George in Al-Humayrah, serving as the monastery's abbot from 1995 to 2002. Through his efforts, the monastery became a center of spiritual and public life in the area.

From 1981 until 2008, he was the instructor of liturgics at the Balamand Seminary. From 1989 until 1992, and then again from 2001 until 2005, he was also the rector of the seminary. During his second term as rector, he was also the abbot of the Balamand monastery. On June 17, 2008, he was chosen as the metropolitan of Western and Central Europe. He was enthroned by Patriarch Ignatius IV of Antioch. On August 19, 2010, his title was changed to "Metropolitan of Europe".

== Patriarchate ==
On December 17, 2012, twelve days after the death of the previous patriarch, Ignatius IV of Antioch, John Yazigi was elected Patriarch of Antioch. This was unexpected as Yazigi had only been a member of the Holy Synod for a little under 5 years, having been elected to the Metropolitan See of Western and Central Europe in 2008. The normal procedure for the election of a Patriarch requires all candidates to have been a member of the Holy Synod for at least 5 years, but reports indicate that the synod agreed to set that rule aside for this election. Patriarch John X arrived in Damascus, Syria on December 20, 2012, for prayers in the Mariamite Cathedral of Damascus, where he also received congratulations from members, civil authorities (including the Minister for Presidential Affairs of the Syrian Arab Republic, Mansour Fadlallah Azzam, on behalf of the President of Syria) and other well-wishers. On Sunday December 23, 2012, the solemn Divine Liturgy of installation and thanksgiving was offered by the newly elected Patriarch.

In his installation sermon, Patriarch John X stressed his rejection of western interference in the Syrian civil war as well as his intention to promote peaceful co-existence with Muslims and other Syrians. The ambassador of the Russian Federation in Damascus, Azmatullah Kulmohammadov, stressed the firm support of Russia for Syrian national unity, national peace and an end to the civil war. The Antiochian Orthodox patriarch in response called upon the entire Syrian people to defend its national unity and to fight instability and insecurity.

On February 10, 2013, John X was formally enthroned as the Metropolitan Bishop of Antioch (the customary see of the Patriarch of Antioch), ceasing to be Metropolitan of Europe. This occasion marks the commencement of John X's patriarchal reign. The enthronement took place in the principal church of the See of Antioch, the Mariamite Cathedral of Damascus, as required by tradition. However, because of the present civil war in Syria the service was necessarily restrained. A second service of enthronement took place on February 17, 2013, in the Cathedral of St Nicholas, Ashrafieh (one of the oldest Christian districts of Beirut), which was attended by Antiochian Orthodox Christians from all over the world, and especially by the President and Prime Minister of Lebanon, and the Patriarch of the Maronite Catholic Church. During his sermon, the Patriarch promised that the Antiochian Church would engage in dialogue based on mutual respect. He also promised to continue the Patriarchate's aid to all families, children and women who are suffering as a result of the conflict. On working together with the Muslim community, he said, "Muslims are partners in the nation, and our ties with them go beyond coexistence; we share with them the responsibility to build a [better] future and confront dangers".

In April 2018, John X of Antioch, together with Moran Mor Ignatius Aphrem II and Greek Melkite Patriarch Youssef Absi, issued a strong condemnation of the 2018 missile strikes against Syria. They said the bombing "were clear violation of the international laws and the UN Charter", and that the "unjust aggression encourages the terrorist organizations and gives them momentum to continue in their terrorism." During a visit from Greek MEP Nikolas Farantouris on 8 March 2025, John X made an appeal to "stop the bloodshed" after a series of mass killings in the face of food and medicine shortages across Christian communities in Syria.

Eastern Orthodox Church titles
Preceded by Ignatius IV of Antioch	Eastern Orthodox Patriarch of Antioch; 2012–present	Incumbent
