= Marmarita =

Village in Syria

Marmarita مرمريتا
- Village
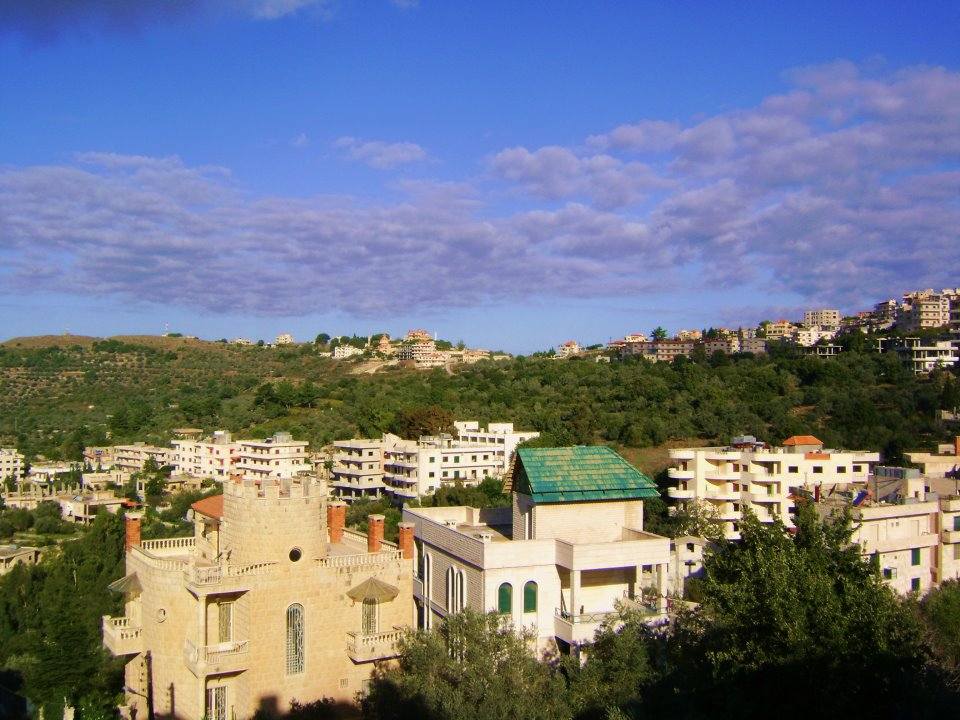

- Location in Syria
- Coordinates: 34°47′N 36°15′E
- Country: Syria
- Governorate: Homs
- District: Talkalakh
- Subdistrict: Al-Nasirah

Population (2004)
  - Total: 2,206
- Time zone: UTC+3 (EET)
  - Summer (DST): UTC+2 (EEST)

Marmarita (Arabic: مرمريتا, Marmarītā) is a village in northwestern Syria, located west of Homs. Marmarita is one of the largest villages in Wadi al-Nasara ("Valley of the Christians"), a region north of Talkalakh. In 2004, Marmarita had a population of 2,206, according to the Central Bureau of Statistics (CBS). Its inhabitants are predominantly Greek Orthodox and Greek Catholic Christians and is one of the largest Christian villages in the Wadi al-Nasara ('valley of the Christians'). Marmarita is a popular summer destination and tourist attraction in Syria. The village has been part of the Homs Governorate since 1953; prior to that, it was part of the Latakia Governorate. The village has three Greek Orthodox Church, a Greek Catholic Church and a Protestant Church.

== Etymology ==
The name Marmarita is believed to be derived from the Syriac word Marmanitha, meaning "a place that overlooks" in possible reference to Marmarita's location above the Akkar Plateau and Mediterranean Sea.

== History ==
Marmarita was settled in the early 17th century by four farming families from Lebanon and the Hauran plateau. These families built three churches (St. John, St. Saba, and St. Boutros) which still remain on the outskirts of the village. Local folklore suggests that the site of the village may have been occupied as early as the 6th century CE, but any habitation was destroyed by a volcanic eruption of the Levant Fault zone.

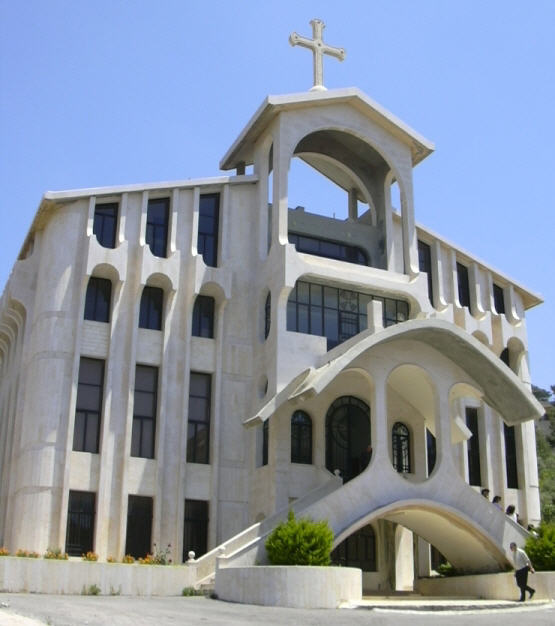
A modern Marmarita church

=== Syrian civil war ===
On 17 August 2013 Syrian News Channel reported that militants killed and wounded Syrian Christians in Marmarita and the neighboring town of al-Husn during the religious festival known as the Dormition of the Theotokos. Jund al-Sham (Soldiers of the Levant) claimed responsibility. It was later claimed that the militant group retreated to Lebanon.

== Climate ==
In Marmarita, the climate is warm and temperate. In winter there is much more rainfall in Marmarita than in summer. The Köppen-Geiger climate classification is Csa. The average annual temperature in Marmarita is 16.5 °C (61.7 °F). About 1,017 mm (40.04 in) of precipitation falls annually.

Climate data for Marmarita
Month	Jan	Feb	Mar	Apr	May	Jun	Jul	Aug	Sep	Oct	Nov	Dec	Year
Mean daily maximum °C (°F)	11.0 (51.8)	12.2 (54.0)	15.4 (59.7)	20.3 (68.5)	24.5 (76.1)	28.1 (82.6)	29.2 (84.6)	30.1 (86.2)	28.5 (83.3)	24.9 (76.8)	19.2 (66.6)	13.4 (56.1)	21.4 (70.5)
Mean daily minimum °C (°F)	3.6 (38.5)	4.5 (40.1)	6.4 (43.5)	9.7 (49.5)	13.2 (55.8)	17.0 (62.6)	19.5 (67.1)	20.0 (68.0)	17.2 (63.0)	13.6 (56.5)	9.5 (49.1)	5.7 (42.3)	11.7 (53.0)
Average precipitation mm (inches)	207 (8.1)	174 (6.9)	143 (5.6)	88 (3.5)	28 (1.1)	2 (0.1)	1 (0.0)	2 (0.1)	13 (0.5)	44 (1.7)	95 (3.7)	220 (8.7)	1,017 (40.0)
Average snowy days	3	2	0	0	0	0	0	0	0	0	0	1	6
Source: Climate-Data.org, Climate data

== Tourism ==
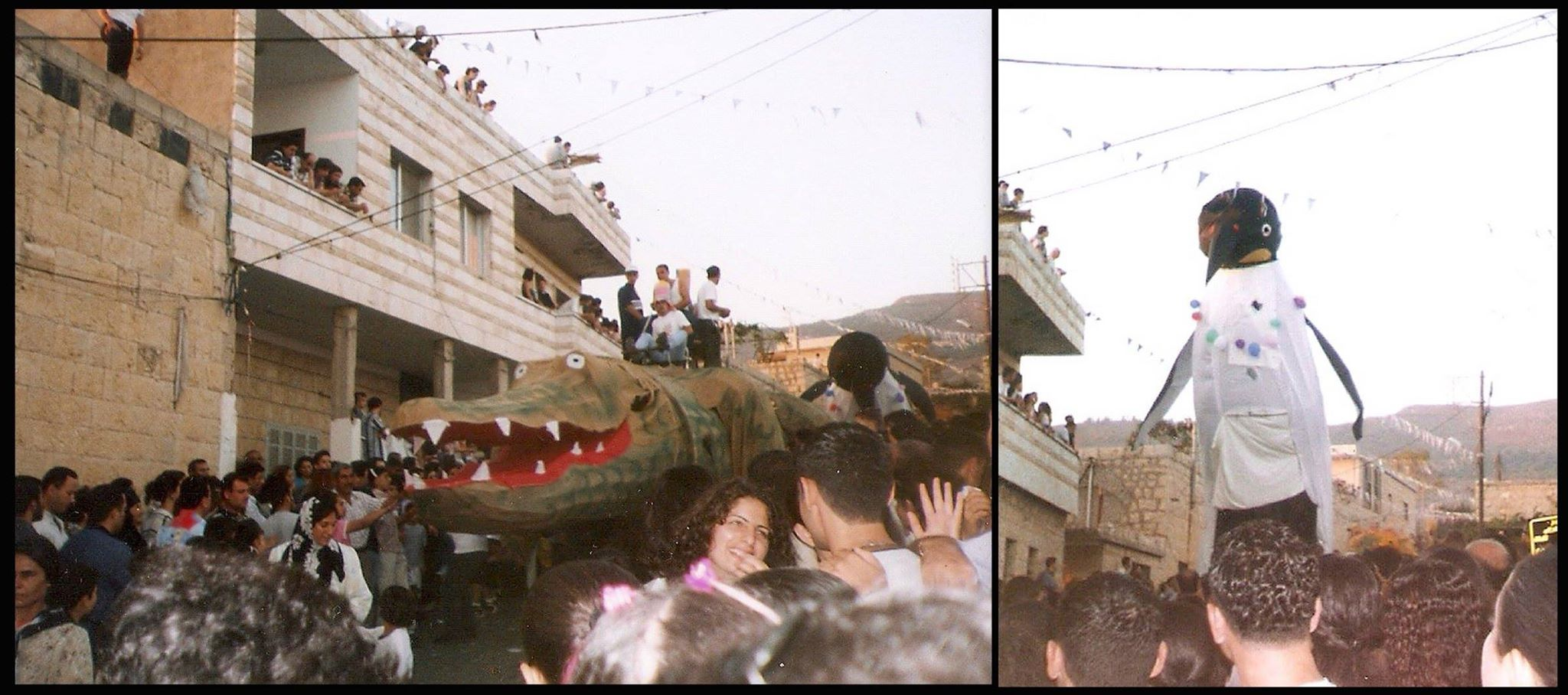
Carnaval Marmarita, 2001

Marmarita is surrounded by a number of ruins and historical sites. The best known of these is the Krak des Chevaliers (also known as "Qal'at al-Ḥiṣn"), a Crusader castle built by the Order of Saint John of Jerusalem between 1142 and 1271. The castle is regarded as one of the most important preserved medieval castles in the world by UNESCO.

The annual Carnival Marmarita was established in 1972 and features processions of vehicles and dancers in costumes..

Marmarita's population changes with the seasons: in winter, the population is about 2,500; in summer it increases to between 25,000 and 30,000 as formerly local families return from jobs in nearby cities to vacation in the area.

== Transport ==
Marmarita is located approximately 13 km north of the M1 motorway, roughly halfway between Tartus and Homs.

The closest airports to Marmarita are Latakia International Airport (LTK) in Syria (93.1 km), Beirut International Airport (BEY) in Lebanon (163.2 km), and Damascus International Airport (DAM) in Syria (196.2 km).
