= Al-Nasirah, Syria =

Al-Nasirah الناصرة al-Nasra
- Town
- Location in Syria
- Coordinates: 34°47′16″N 36°17′9″E
- Country: Syria
- Governorate: Homs
- District: Talkalakh
- Subdistrict: Al-Nasirah

Population (2004)
  - Total: 835
- Time zone: UTC+3 (EET)
  - Summer (DST): UTC+2 (EEST)

Al-Nasirah (Arabic: الناصرة, also spelled al-Nasra) is a small Christian town in northwestern Syria, administratively part of the Homs Governorate, located west of Homs. Nearby localities include Habnamrah to the northwest, Marmarita and Ayn al-Bardah to the west, Zweitina to the southwest, al-Husn to the south, al-Huwash and al-Mazinah to the southeast, Shin to the east, Muqlus to the northeast, Hadeih and Mashta al-Helu to the north. According to the Syria Central Bureau of Statistics (CBS), al-Nasirah had a population of 835 in the 2004 census. It is the administrative center of the al-Nasirah nahiyah ("subdistrict") which consisted of 20 localities with a collective population of 16,678 in 2004. The subdistrict largely occupies an area known as Wadi al-Nasara ("Valley of the Christians.") The inhabitants of the town are predominantly Greek Orthodox Christians. The village has a Greek Orthodox Church.

Lady of the Valley, located in Wadi al-Nasara, is one of the Marian shrines in the Middle East.

== Bibliography ==
- Smith, Eli; Robinson, Edward (1841). Biblical Researches in Palestine, Mount Sinai and Arabia Petraea: A Journal of Travels in the Year 1838. Vol. 3. Crocker and Brewster.
