= Talkalakh =

Talkalakh تَلْكَلَخ Tal Kalakh
- City
- Location in Syria
- Coordinates: 34°40′38.16″N 36°15′01.46″E
- Country: Syria
- Governorate: Homs
- District: Talkalakh
- Subdistrict: Talkalakh
- Elevation: 265 m (869 ft)

Population (2004)
  - Total: 18,412
- Time zone: UTC+2 (EET)
  - Summer (DST): +3

Talkalakh (Arabic: تَلْكَلَخ, romanized: Talkalaḵ) is a city in western Syria administratively belonging to the Homs Governorate as the capital of the Talkalakh District just north of the border with Lebanon and west of Homs. According to the Central Bureau of Statistics (CBS) Talkalakh had a population of 18,412 in 2004. Its inhabitants are predominantly Sunni Muslims, while the surrounding villages are mostly inhabited by Alawites. Most of the city's Sunni Muslim residents have fled as a result of the ongoing Syrian civil war.

People in the city depend on trade and public services as the main source of income. It has six mosques and two main small squares: Al Hurria and Al Saha Al Amma Squares.

== History ==
During the Ottoman era, between the 18th and 19th centuries, Talkalakh was home to the wealthy and influential Danadisha (also spelled Dandashi) clan. They stiffly competed with Hammadi family and the al-Jundi family of Homs and Hama.

The Arab horse O'Bajan was born in this town in 1880.

=== Syrian civil war ===
On May 15, 2011, as a part of the Syrian civil war, the Syrian Army shelled Talkalakh in response to attacks on the army that occurred a day before in the city. Seven civilians were killed and at least 2,000 residents tried to flee from the city into Lebanon.

A resident claimed that Shabiha militias were targeting the Sunni inhabitants, assuring that "The city of Talkalakh is empty of people. Most of them have fled to Lebanon,". The remainder of its Sunni residents continued protesting against the government.

On 12 February 2013, a CNN report from inside Talkalakh revealed that the town itself was under rebel control, though government forces were only a matter of yards away, surrounding the town. Nevertheless, there was no fighting in or around the town thanks to a tenuous ceasefire between the warring sides brokered by a local sheikh and an Alawite member of parliament. The ceasefire ended in June 2013, when government forces drove out the rebels and took control of the town.

Since the end of the Syrian Civil War an estimated 12,396 people have returned to Talkalakh from abroad.

== Bibliography ==
- Douwes, Dick (2000). The Ottomans in Syria: a history of justice and oppression. I.B. Tauris. ISBN 1860640311.
