= Al-Hawash, Homs =

Town in Syria

Al-Hawash الحواش
- Town
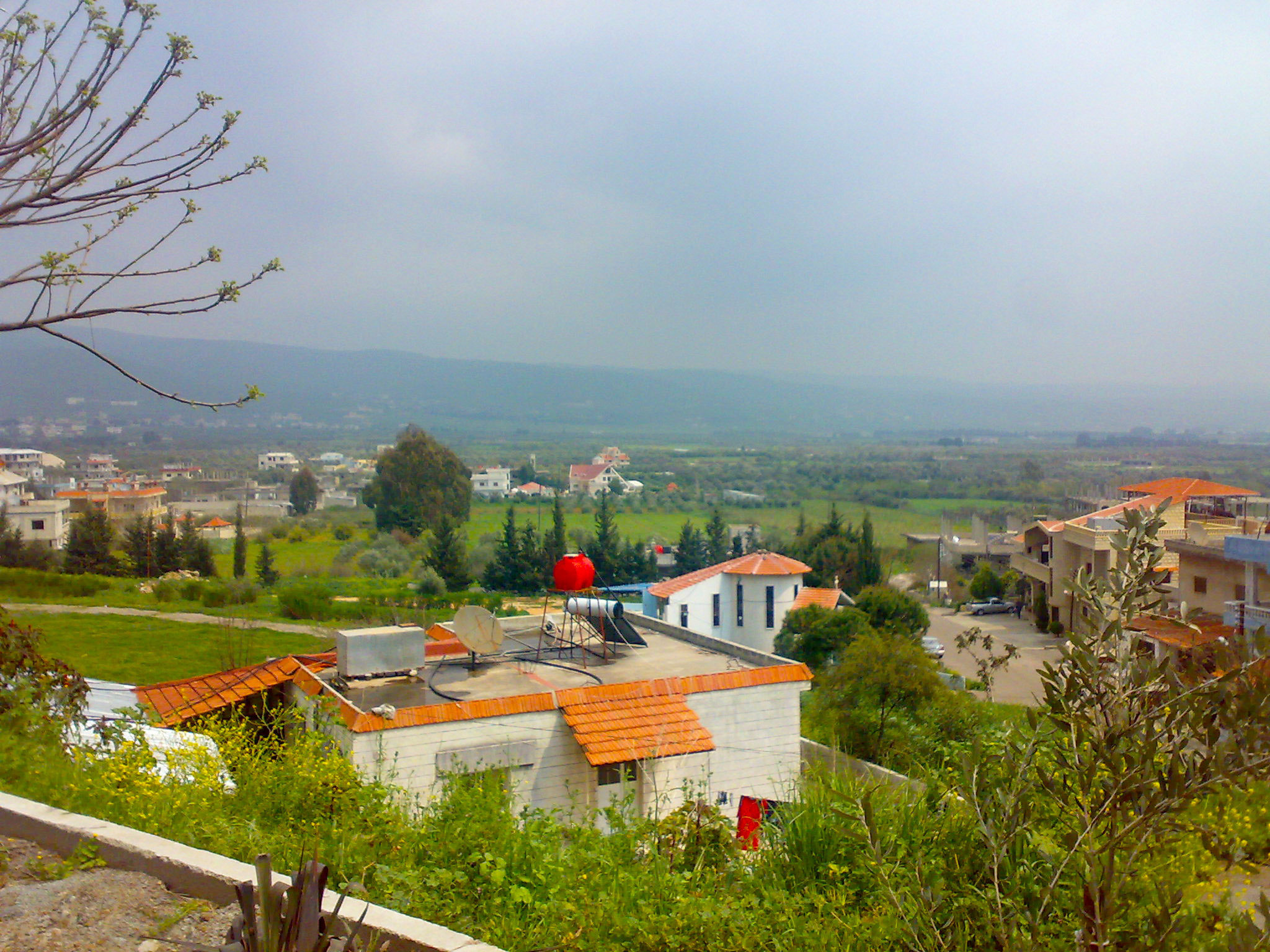
- Al-Hawash skyline

- Location in Syria
- Coordinates: 34°45′53″N 36°19′8″E
- Country: Syria
- Governorate: Homs
- District: Talkalakh
- Subdistrict: Hawash

Population (2004)
  - Total: 4,067

Al-Hawash (Arabic: الحواش / ALA-LC: al-Ḥwāsh) is a Greek Orthodox Christians town in northwestern Syria, administratively belonging to the Homs Governorate. Nearby towns include al-Husn and Marmarita to the west, Shin to the east and Talkalakh to the southwest. According to the Central Bureau of Statistics (CBS) Hawash had a population of 4,067 in 2004. Its inhabitants are predominantly Christians, much like most of the villages in the area. The village has two Greek Orthodox Church and a Greek Catholic Church.

Its location in the midst of a coniferous mountain makes it a popular and favored summer destination. Hawash is the largest village in Wadi al-Nasara ("Valley of Christians") region. It is an important historic site and used to be a popular tourist attraction before the outbreak of the Syrian civil war.

== Etymology ==
The name Hawash is derived from Hoshe which is Arabic for "Corsage" or place of flowers. It has been also suggested that Wash is a word form an old Syriac language which mean 'the good soil'.

== History ==
Al-Hawash is said to date to the 18th-century. Along with many other villages in the area, the earliest inhabitants of Hawash had immigrated from the southern Hauran plain. It has buildings built as early as the late 17th century.

In 1838, the villagers were noted as being Greek Orthodox Christians.

== Bibliography ==
- Robinson, E.; Smith, E. (1841). Biblical Researches in Palestine, Mount Sinai and Arabia Petraea: A Journal of Travels in the year 1838. Vol. 3. Boston: Crocker & Brewster.
