= Talkalakh District =

Talkalakh District منطقة تلكلخ
- District
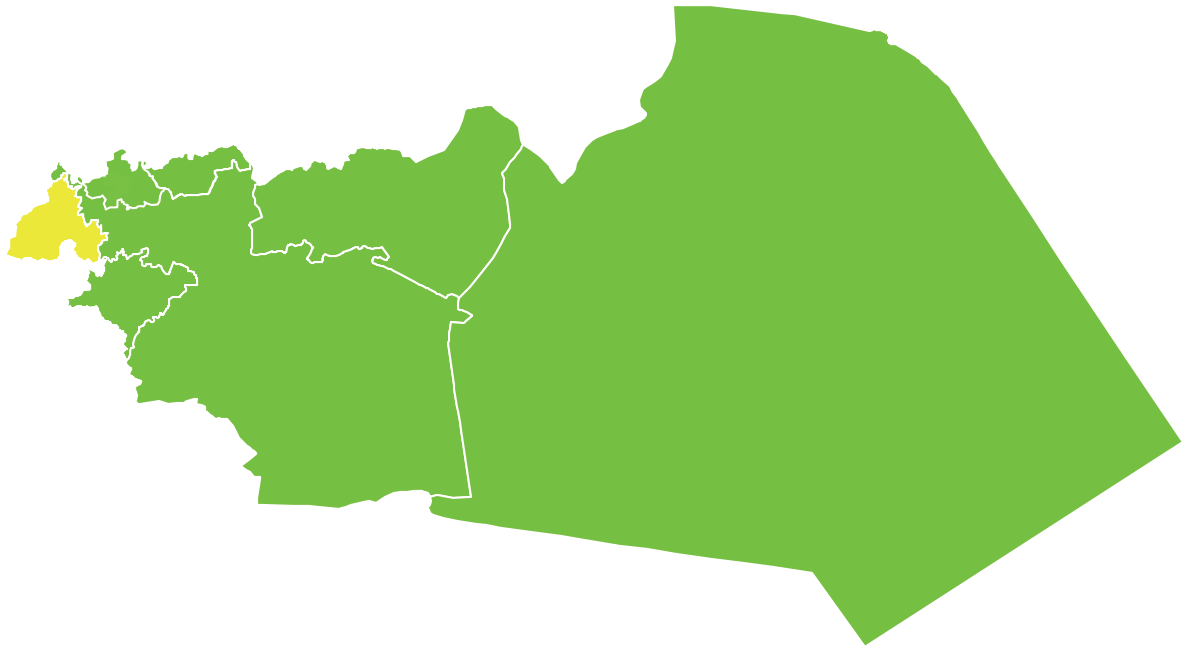
- Map of Talkalakh District within Homs Governorate
- Coordinates (Talkalakh): 34°40′38″N 36°15′01″E
- Country: Syria
- Governorate: Homs
- Established: 2010
- Seat: Talkalakh
- Subdistricts: 4 nawāḥī

Area
  - Total: 476.15 km^{2} (183.84 sq mi)

Population (2004)
  - Total: 129,429
  - Density: 271.82/km^{2} (704.02/sq mi)
- Geocode: SY0403

Talkalakh District (Arabic: منطقة تلكلخ, romanized: manṭiqat Talkalaḫ) is a district (manṭiqat) of the Homs Governorate, Syria. According to the 2004 census, the district had a population of 129,429. The district is divided into four sub-districts (nawāḥī).

== History ==
After the Syrian revolution in 2011, the Syrian government forces launched a military operation in Talkalakh, which resulted in several arrests and killings. In June 2013, the Hezbollah, supported by the government forces and other pro-government militias, launched an offensive against Talkalakh, which resulted in further destruction, civilian deaths, and arrests. The government gained control of the territory in June 2013. The conflict resulted in extensive displacement of people, with several fleeing to nearby Lebanon. Though the displaced people started returning following the fall of the Bashar al-Assad-led government in December 2024, the region continued to experience sporadic acts of violence.

== Geography ==
Talkalakh District is one of the six administrative districts (manṭiqat) of Homs Governorate, Syria. Talkalakh is located near the Syria-Lebanon border, along the Homs–Tartus highway, approximately 45 km (28 mi) west of Homs.

The district is divided into four sub-districts (nawāḥī)–Talkalakh (تلكلخ), Hadidah (حديدة), Al-Nasirah (الناصرة), and Al-Hawash (الحواش).

== Demographics ==
According to the 2004 census, the district had a population of 129,429, comprising 66,118 males and 63,311 females. The census recorded 23,806 households, with an average household size of 5.4 people. The illiteracy rate was 9.8% among males and 24.0% among females. About 60.6% of the population were recorded as engaged in paid work, 22.1% were self-employed and 12.0% worked without pay. Approximately 83.0% of the households were own houses. The population consisted of majority Sunni Muslims with significant Alawite and Christian population in the rural areas.

According to the United Nations Office for the Coordination of Humanitarian Affairs, population estimates for August 2020 recorded 36,447 residents, 1,315 internally displaced persons (IDP) and 137 returnees in Talkalakh Subdistrict. Hadidah had 44,044 residents, Al-Hawash had 23,931 residents and 20,831 IDPs, while Al-Nasirah had 20,198 residents and 37,213 IDPs.
