= Al-Quniyah =

Al-Quniyah القنية
- Location in Syria
- Coordinates: 35°55′N 36°19′E
- Country: Syria
- Governorate: Idlib
- District: Jisr al-Shugur
- Subdistrict: Al-Janudiyah
- Elevation: 450 m (1,480 ft)

Population (2004 census)
  - Total: 587
- Time zone: UTC+2 (EET)
  - Summer (DST): UTC+3 (EEST)

Al-Quniyah (Arabic: القنية, also spelled Quniya or Qunaya) is a Christian village in northwestern Syria, administratively belonging to the Idlib Governorate, located northwest of Idlib, 35 km north of Jisr ash-Shugur, and is in between Lattakia (90 km (56 mi)) and Aleppo ( 120 km (75 mi)). Al-Quniyah is situated 450 meters (1476 ft) above sea level. According to the Syria Central Bureau of Statistics, al-Quniyah had a population of 587 in the 2004 census. Its inhabitants are predominantly Catholic Christians with a small Alawite minority.

== Geography ==
Nearby localities include Kafr Dibbin (Hamama) to the east, Zarzur, Amud, and Darkush to the northeast, Yakubiyah, Judaida to the west and Jisr al-Shughur to the south.

Town climate is Mediterranean, whereas the winter is cold, rainy, snowy at times; the summer is warm.

== History ==
During the period when both Al-Yacoubiyah and Al-Quniyah were full of ethnic Armenians, there were two priests in the now demolished church of Saint Cyprian (Note: It is currently unknown which Saint Cyprian this refers to.), Father Mesrob and Father Der Krikor. The former was sent to Al-Qunaya by The Armenian Apostolic Bishopric in Aleppo, while the latter was the priest in Al-Yacoubiyah. Is it said that Al-Qunaya was split between the family of Sheikh Hanna and the Joubi family. Father Mesrob sided with the Joubi family and started working againt Sheikh Hanna. It is said that Sheikh Hanna had a bad temper. Sunday services were held alternatively between the two priests. One time, it was Fr. Der Krikor's turn in service, but Fr. Mesrob got ready for service too, and when Sheikh Hanna told him to wait for his turn and he ignored, Sheikh Hanna beat him, causing his nose to bleed. Supporters of the Jobi family took advantage of the situation and went with Fr. Mesrob to the Bishopric in Aleppo to file a complaint against Sheikh Hanna. But they didn't get the attention they hoped to get, so after leaving the Bishopric, disappointed, they decided to turn to the Protestants. During that time, there was a Protestant called Krikor Agha who had lands in Al-Qunaya. They proposed to him the idea of converting to Protestantism to free themselves from the authority of Sheikh Hanna. However, he was not convinced and told them to go to the Franciscans since they are stronger in the area. The Armenians liked the idea, and they went to Fr. Fernando K. which was the Head of the Franciscans in Aleppo. Fr. Fernardo presents the idea to The Papal Envoy in Beirut, and he accepts. The Papal Envoy sends a Franciscan Father to Al-Qunaya, named Fernandez Bonaventura with money and food. The Joubi family gave the Catholic Father a house, and in the Catholic diaries in Al-Qunaya was written: "Look at God's wisdom, those people didn't change their denomination for a good cause or to look for truth, but only to save their lives, and he still helped them and saved their souls." Fr. Bonaventura was a graduate of the missionary school, he was therefore exceptionally well-equipped in terms of theology and religious knowledge, and he employed every means at his disposal to achieve his ends. So he went to every house in the village and befriended the entire Armenian population. He invited the poor of them to his house, gave them money and food, and then invited them to daily prayers. He healed some with herbs, and the Joubi family supported him and helped him by facilitating his works. This situation caused a war between the two parties, and incidents began happening more frequently day after day. Sheikh Hanna pushed Fr. Bonaventura to give up by using money and expensive gifts, but the Franciscans befriended the local government in Jisr ash-Shughur and starting putting pressure on Sheikh Hanna. Slowly but surely, the Catholics grew stronger, and the Armenians grew weaker. In 1863, the Sublime Porte ratified a new Constitution, and this ratification opened a path between the Patriarchate of Sis and the Patriarchate of Jerusalem. When the latter lost the authority on its endowments and therefore lost important revenues, the situation turned into a sort of battle. And the Armenian Bishopric of Aleppo remained in a state of disarray, and couldn't help the Armenians of Al-Qunaya for a long period of time, while the Catholics were growing even stronger. And when Sheikh Hanna passed away in 1904, most of Al-Qunaya was converted to Catholicism. When the Church of St. Cyprian was demolished, everything was destroyed except a single bowl, which currently sits in a museum in Aleppo. After the success the Franciscans saw in Al-Quniyah, they tried the same with Al-Yacoubiyah, but only 5 families converted there. Missionaries of the Franciscan Fathers (the Holy Land Rangers) (From Latin Catholic) came to the village in 1878 and built a church, Monastery, clinic and the first Arabic school in northwestern Syria, they re-built the church in 1885 and the current church dates to 1932. Postal Service began in 1927 and the telephone arrived to the village in 1929. The municipality was established in 1932 and electricity came to the village in 1935 and the customs in 1937.

In January 2013, during the ongoing Syrian civil war, al-Quniyah and the nearby Christian-inhabited villages of al-Yacoubiyah and Judayda were captured by anti-government rebels. The area became controlled by Salafi jihadist groups, mainly Ahrar al-Sham, Ansar al-Tawhid, Hurras al-Din, the Turkistan Islamic Party and later by Hay'at Tahrir al-Sham. On 11 May 2015, the village was bombed by the Syrian Air Force, leading to the death of 18 people.

== Demographics ==
al-Quniyah represents one of the five Christian villages in the Idlib Governorate; the others are al-Yacoubiyah, Judayda, al-Ghassaniyah and Hallouz. The Christians of al-Quniyah are Catholics who adhere to the Latin Church. Some Alawite families also live in the village. In 2010 the population of the village was around 500 people during the winter and reached 2000 people during the summer, since many inhabitants lived elsewhere in the country, mainly in Aleppo and Latakia. The church organized every year a summer camp for the young of the community. During the last years before the outbreak of the Syrian civil war many inhabitants began to return to live in the village and to invest in the local agricultural economy.

Since 2013, during the civil war, the Jihadist groups active in the area restricted the residents' religious freedoms and most of the properties owned by the Christians were expropriated. Most of the local Christian community abandoned the village, settling mainly in regime-controlled areas, especially in Aleppo. Refugees displaced from other regions of Syria settled in the village, as well as foreign fighters, causing a demographic change. Since 2021, the Syrian Salvation Government led by Hay'at Tahrir al-Sham has adopted a more inclusive approach, starting a policy of restitution of land, houses and businesses to Christians and encouraging them to return. Since 2023, some young Christian men and families have returned to settle in the village. At the end of 2023, there were an estimated 92 Christian families in al-Quniyah.

Many more Christian families began to return to the village since the end of 2024 to reclaim and restore their properties and settle. The new government and the local authorities began relocating displaced families, in order to return the houses to their Christian owners. The returnees are beginning to revive the village, and schools are being established for the youth.

== Buildings ==
Some archaeological artifacts date back to 2000 BC. There is an ancient church in the village cemetery of the Church of St.Kiprianos from the fifth century AD.
