= Al-Yacoubiyah =

Al-Yacoubiyah اليعقوبية Եագուպիէ
- Village
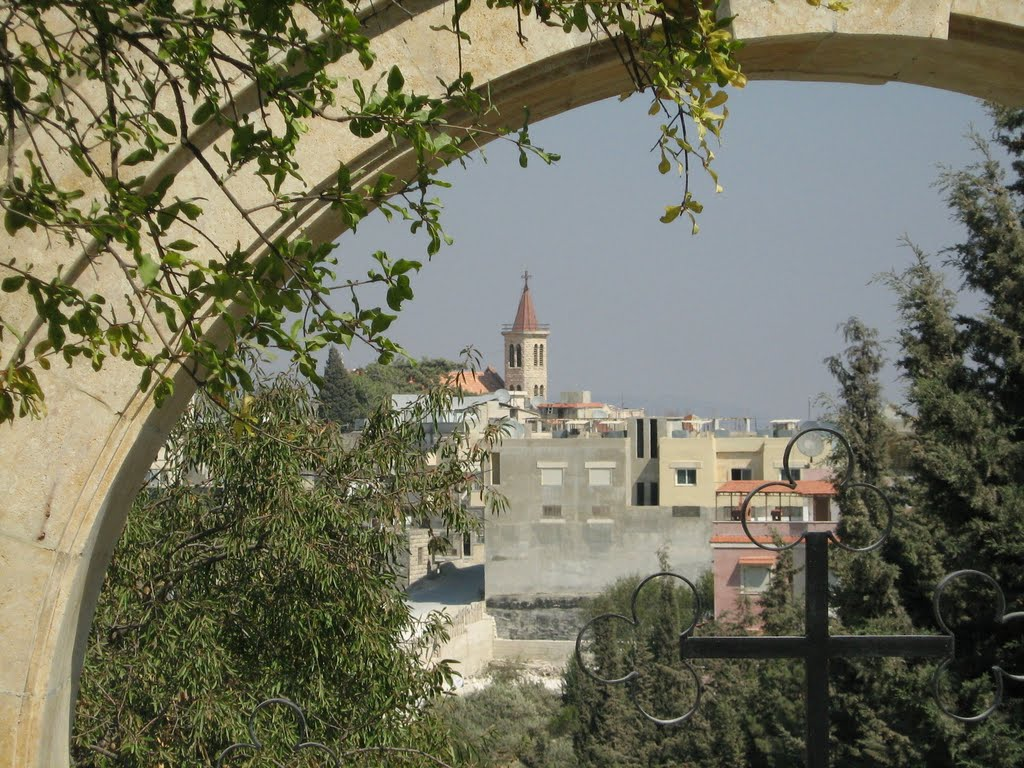
- The village as seen from St. Anna church

- Location within Syria
- Coordinates: 35.922250°N 36.314426°E
- Country: Syria
- Governorate: Idlib
- District: Jisr al-Shughur
- Subdistrict: Al-Janudiyah
- Elevation: 480 m (1,570 ft)

Population (2004)
  - Total: 476
- Time zone: UTC+2 (EET)
  - Summer (DST): UTC+3 (EEST)

Al-Yacoubiyah (Arabic: اليعقوبية, romanized: al-Yaʿqūbīyah, Armenian: Եագուպիէ; also spelled Yacoubiyeh, Yakoubieh, Yacoubeh or Yaqoubiyah) is a Christian village in north-west Syria, administratively part of the Jisr ash-Shugur District, subordinate to the Idlib Governorate, located west of Idlib and just southeast of the border with Turkey. It is situated in a well-forested mountain above the Orontes River, with an elevation of 480 meters above sea level. Nearby localities include Qunaya adjacent to the east, Kafr Debbin further to the east, the nahiyah ("subdistrict") center of al-Janudiyah to the south, al-Malnad to the west, Judayda (Al-Jisser) adjacent to the north and Zarzur further to the north.

According to the Syria Central Bureau of Statistics (CBS), al-Yacoubiyah had a population of 476 in the 2004 census. Its inhabitants are mostly Christians, roughly split into the Armenian Apostolic and Catholic denominations. The surrounding areas are predominantly inhabited by Sunni Muslims. There are two Armenian Apostolic churches in al-Yacoubiyah: Saint Anna (Armenian: Սբ. Աննա) and Saint Hripsime (Armenian: Սբ. Հռիփսիմե). The last one is built similar to Ejmiatsin's Saint Hripsime. There is also one Catholic church called Immaculate Conception Church (Arabic: كنيسة الحبل بلا دنس).

== History ==
Al-Yacoubiyah, along with the nearby localities of Kesab and Ghenamiyah, were settled by the Armenian community between the 8th and 12th centuries CE.

In 1929, by the efforts of Armenian General Benevolent Union (AGBU) and the Armenian Prelacy, Diocese of Aleppo, an Armenian school was built in the village, where Armenian is taught alongside Arabic.

=== Syrian Civil War ===
During the ongoing Syrian Civil War which began in 2011, in late January 2013, al-Yacoubiyah was captured by anti-government rebels. Most of the fighting for the village's capture centered on a Syrian Army post at the village entrance and government troops subsequently withdrew to Jisr al-Shughur. While al-Yacoubiyah's infrastructure was not significantly damaged and no residents were killed in the clashes, many of its abandoned houses and businesses were looted. Rebels commandeered some of the empty houses of the village, claiming they received permission by its residents. According to local residents, many of al-Yacoubiyah's Armenians have fled the village while most of its Catholics remained. During the Assad Regime, the village was under administration by the Tahrir al-Sham rebel organisation. Now, residents of the village are fully allowed to go there and some families have already settled.

== See also ==
- Armenians in Syria
- List of Armenian ethnic enclaves
