= Al-Janudiyah =

Al-Janudiyah ٱلْجَانُودِيَّة
- Town
- Location within Syria
- Coordinates: 35°53′05″N 36°17′27″E
- Country: Syria
- Governorate: Idlib Governorate
- District: Jisr al-Shughur District
- Subdistrict: al-Janudiyah Subdistrict

Population (2004 census)
  - Total: 7,774
- Time zone: UTC+2 (EET)
  - Summer (DST): UTC+3 (EEST)

Al-Janudiyah (Arabic: ٱلْجَانُودِيَّة, romanized: al-Jānūdīyah; also spelled al-Janoudiya, el-Janudieh, al-Janoodiya) is a town in northern Syria, administratively part of the Idlib Governorate, located northwest of Idlib along the western banks on the Orontes River in Zawiya Mountain. Nearby localities include Shughur Fawqani to the southwest, Jisr al-Shughur 10 kilometers to the south, Bishlamun to the southeast, Kafr Dibbin to the northeast, Yacoubiyah and al-Qunaya to the north, and Maland to the northwest. It is located close to the Syria–Turkey border.

According to the Syria Central Bureau of Statistics, al-Janudiyah had a population of 5,295 in the 2004 census. The town is also the administrative center of the Al-Janudiyah nahiyah which consists of 13 localities with a combined population of 19,642. The town's inhabitants are predominantly Arab Sunni Muslims.

Al-Janudiya contains ancient pottery resembling that of the Amuq region. The geology of the site is marked by soft marl and limestone.

== Syrian civil war ==
During a Syrian Army operation against opposition rebels in Jisr al-Shughur, on 15 June 2011, al-Janudiyah was surrounded by Syrian troops. On 5 September, after clashing with army deserters fleeing towards the nearby border with Turkey, armor-backed Syrian troops entered al-Janudiyah, according to witnesses. Later, on 15 September, a boy was reportedly killed by security forces during an anti-government demonstration in the town, according to opposition activists.

Clashes in al-Janudiyah on 11 March left three Syrian Army soldiers and one civilian dead according to the Syrian Observatory for Human Rights. On 1 April a Syrian Army convoy was assaulted by defectors resulting in the deaths of four soldiers and the injuring of eleven others.

In the first days of February 2013, Syrian opposition rebels captured al-Janudiyah and nearby Yakubiyah located on the border with Turkey.

== Bibliography ==
- Krasheninnikov, Valery A. (2005) Geological Framework of the Levant. Volume 1: Cyprus and Syria. Historical Productions Law
- Matthers, John (1981). The River Qoueiq, Northern Syria, and Its Catchment: Studies Arising from the Tell Rifa'at Survey 1977-79. B.A.R
