= Darkush =

Darkush دَرْكُوش
- Town
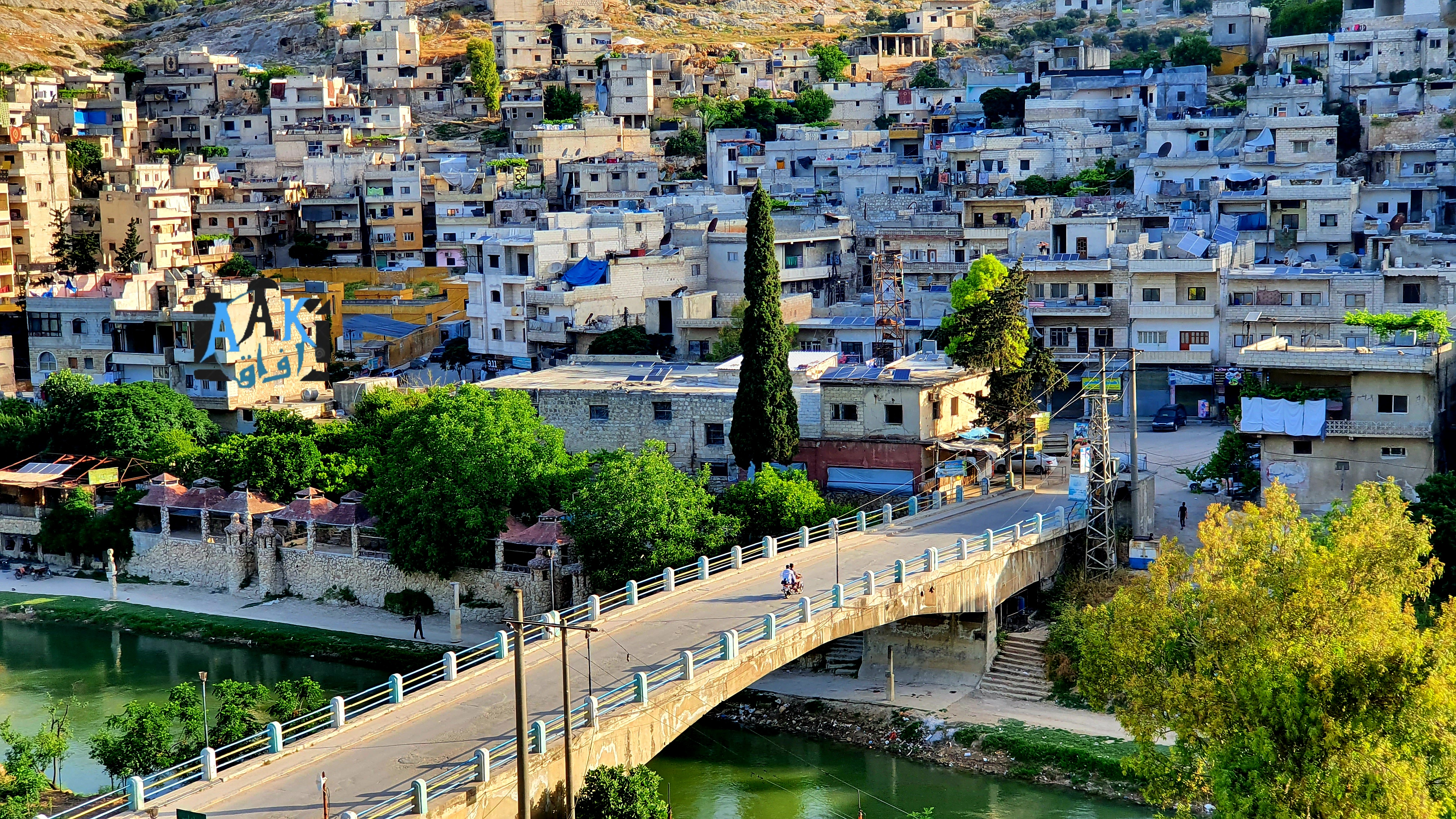
- Darkush in 2020

- Location within Syria
- Coordinates: 35°59′33″N 36°23′35″E
- Country: Syria
- Governorate: Idlib Governorate
- District: Jisr al-Shughur District
- Subdistrict: Darkush Subdistrict

Population (2004 census)
  - Total: 5,295
- Time zone: UTC+2 (EET)
  - Summer (DST): UTC+3 (EEST)

Darkush (Arabic: دَرْكُوش, romanized: Darkūš; also spelled Darkoush or Derkush) is a town in northern Syria, administratively part of the Idlib Governorate, located northwest of Idlib along the Syrian–Turkish borders on the Orontes River. Nearby localities include al-Janudiyah, Zarzur and al-Najiyah to the southwest, Jisr al-Shughur to the south and Millis and Maarrat Misrin to the east. According to the Syria Central Bureau of Statistics, Darkush had a population of 5,295 in the 2004 census. The town is also the administrative center of the Darkush nahiyah which consists of 19 villages with a combined population of 23,022. Its inhabitants are predominantly Sunni Muslims.

== History ==
An inscription at the town, dating back to Roman times, attests to the existence of a shipwright in the town, building river-going boats to use on the Orontes. The town also has the remains of an ancient bridge. The Christianization of the city probably happened after 322.

During the Crusades, the town was the property of the Principality of Antioch until it was captured by Saladin in 1188. Crusaders under Bohemond VI of Antioch and Tripoli recaptured the town in 1260. The Mamluk Sultan Baibars gained control in 1267. Nothing remains of the town's Crusader citadel, as it was quarried for building stones. Darkush was visited by Syrian geographer Yaqut al-Hamawi in the 1220s, during Ayyubid rule. He noted that it was a "fortress near Antâkiyyah, in the 'Awâsim Province."

On 13 August 1822 the town and its surrounding areas were devastated by a massive earthquake, killing 20,000 people.

=== Modern era ===
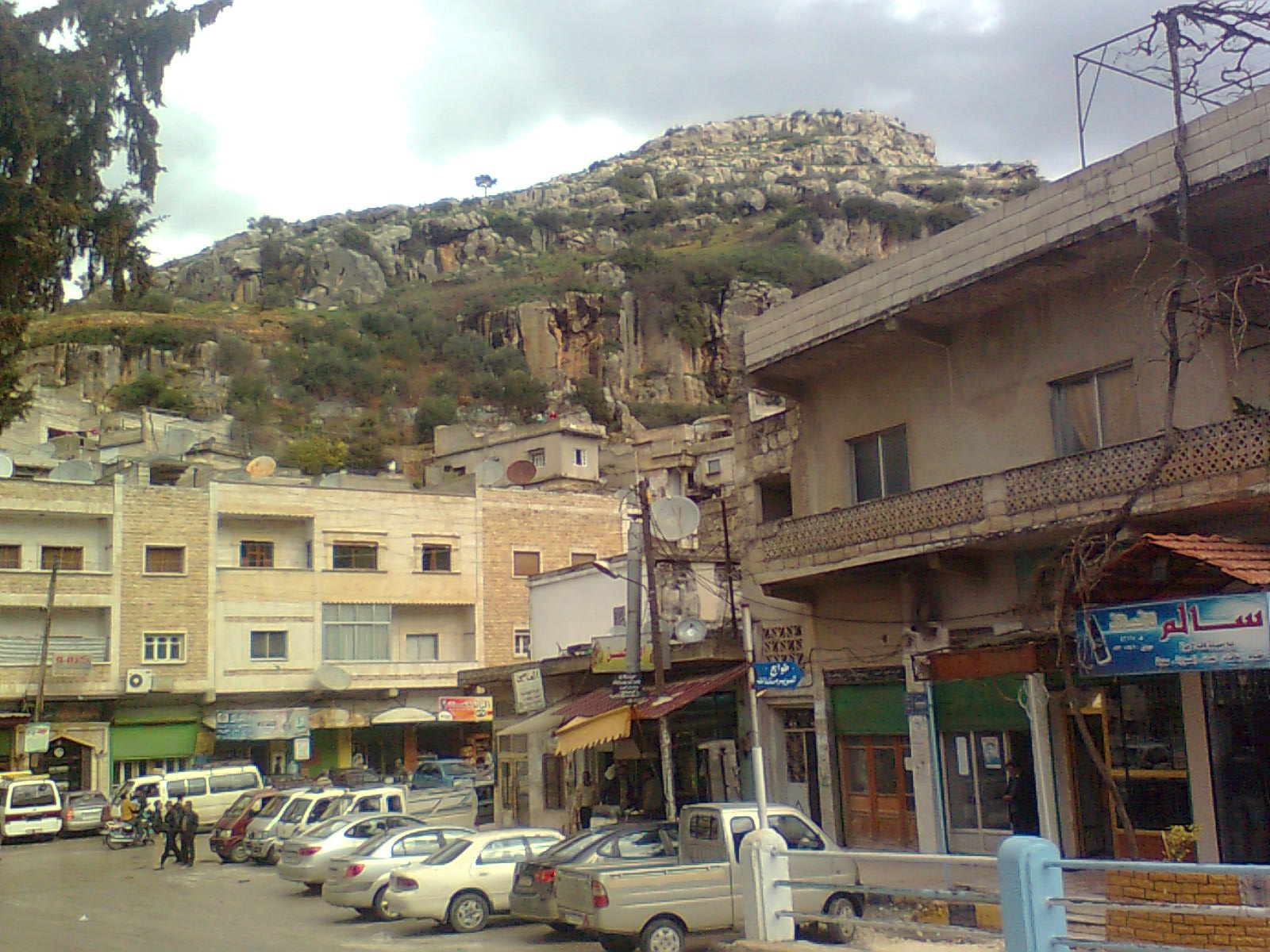
Darkush in 2011

In the early 1960s it was described a large village of 2,500 residents and "one of the most picturesque" places in the area by geographer and author Robert Boulanger.

During the ongoing Syrian civil war which started in March 2011, Darkush was Liberated by anti-government forces in November 2012. Until then, the town was roughly divided politically with the residents in the northern part supporting the opposition while the south largely supported the government. Damaged buildings formerly belonging to the Regime forces marked the dividing line between the two sections. By late January 2013, the town was firmly in rebel hands and is used as a launching point for military operations against Regime-held positions in the mountains to the south.

== Geography ==
The town of Darkush lies in a wadi in the Orontes River basin, at the foothills of the an-Nusayriyah Mountains.

== Bibliography ==
- Butcher, Kevin (2004). Roman Syria and the Near East. Getty Publications. ISBN 9780892367153.
- Boulanger, Robert, ed. (1966). The Middle East, Lebanon, Syria, Jordan, Iraq, Iran. Hachette.
- Trombley, Frank R. (2001). Hellenic Religion and Christianization. C. 370-529. Vol. 2. BRILL. ISBN 9780391041219.
- Molin, Kristian (2003). Unknown Crusader Castles. Continuum International Publishing Group. ISBN 9781852852610.
- le Strange, Guy (1890). Palestine Under the Moslems: A Description of Syria and the Holy Land from A.D. 650 to 1500. Committee of the Palestine Exploration Fund.
- Barker, John (January 1999). Syria and Egypt under the Last Five Sultans of Turkey: Being Experiences, during Fifty Years, of Mr. Consul-General Barker. Chiefly from His Letters and Journals. Volume 1. Elibron.com. ISBN 9781402187858.
- Royal Geographic Society (1886). Proceedings of the Royal Geographical Society and monthly record of geography, Volume 8. Edward Stanford.
