= Nasra, Idlib =

Nasra, Idlib الناصرة
- Village
- Location in Syria
- Country: Syria
- Governorate: Idlib
- District: Jisr al-Shughur District
- Subdistrict: Al-Janudiyah Nahiyah

Population (2004)
  - Total: 128
- Time zone: UTC+2 (EET)
  - Summer (DST): UTC+3 (EEST)
- City Qrya Pcode: C4262

Nasra, Idlib (Arabic: الناصرة) is a Syrian village located in Al-Janudiyah Nahiyah in Jisr al-Shughur District, Idlib. According to the Syria Central Bureau of Statistics (CBS), Nasra, Idlib had a population of 128 in the 2004 census.
