= Jamiliya =

Jamiliya الجميلية
- Village
- Location in Syria
- Country: Syria
- Governorate: Idlib
- District: Jisr al-Shughur District
- Subdistrict: Darkush Nahiyah

Population (2004)
  - Total: 612
- Time zone: UTC+2 (EET)
  - Summer (DST): UTC+3 (EEST)
- City Qrya Pcode: C4241

Jamiliya (Arabic: الجميلية) is a Syrian village located in Darkush Nahiyah in Jisr al-Shughur District, Idlib. According to the Syria Central Bureau of Statistics (CBS), Jamiliya had a population of 612 in the 2004 census.
