= Zahraa, Idlib =

Zahraa الزهراء
- Village
- Location in Syria
- Coordinates: 35°59′1″N 36°22′44″E
- Country: Syria
- Governorate: Idlib
- District: Jisr al-Shughur District
- Subdistrict: Darkush Nahiyah

Population (2004)
  - Total: 871
- Time zone: UTC+2 (EET)
  - Summer (DST): UTC+3 (EEST)
- City Qrya Pcode: C4250

Zahraa (Arabic: الزهراء) is a Syrian village located in Darkush Nahiyah in Jisr al-Shughur District, Idlib. According to the Syria Central Bureau of Statistics (CBS), Zahraa had a population of 871 in the 2004 census.
