= Qaderiyeh - Qayqun =

Qaderiyeh - Qayqun القادرية قيقون
- Village
- Location in Syria
- Coordinates: 35.898889°N 36.310833°E
- Country: Syria
- Governorate: Idlib
- District: Jisr al-Shughur District
- Subdistrict: Al-Janudiyah Nahiyah

Population (2004)
  - Total: 1,140
- Time zone: UTC+2 (EET)
  - Summer (DST): UTC+3 (EEST)
- City Qrya Pcode: C4258

Qaderiyeh - Qayqun (Arabic: القادرية قيقون) is a Syrian village located in Al-Janudiyah Nahiyah in Jisr al-Shughur District, Idlib. According to the Syria Central Bureau of Statistics (CBS), Qaderiyeh - Qayqun had a population of 1140 in the 2004 census.
