= Tiba - Katrin =

Tiba - Katrin الطيبة كترين
- Village
- Location in Syria
- Country: Syria
- Governorate: Idlib
- District: Jisr al-Shughur District
- Subdistrict: Al-Janudiyah Nahiyah

Population (2004)
  - Total: 324
- Time zone: UTC+2 (EET)
  - Summer (DST): UTC+3 (EEST)
- City Qrya Pcode: C4264

Tiba - Katrin (Arabic: الطيبة كترين) is a Syrian village located in Al-Janudiyah Nahiyah in Jisr al-Shughur District, Idlib. According to the Syria Central Bureau of Statistics (CBS), Tiba - Katrin had a population of 324 in the 2004 census.
