= Hassaniyeh - Hatya =

Hassaniyeh - Hatya الحسانية هتيا
- Village
- Location in Syria
- Country: Syria
- Governorate: Idlib
- District: Jisr al-Shughur District
- Subdistrict: Al-Janudiyah Nahiyah

Population (2004)
  - Total: 681
- Time zone: UTC+2 (EET)
  - Summer (DST): UTC+3 (EEST)
- City Qrya Pcode: C4257

Hassaniyeh - Hatya (Arabic: الحسانية هتيا) is a Syrian village located in Al-Janudiyah Subdistrict in Jisr al-Shughur District, Idlib. According to the Syria Central Bureau of Statistics (CBS), Hassaniyeh - Hatya had a population of 681 in the 2004 census.
