= Jannet Elqora =

Jannet Elqora جنة القرى
- Village
- Location in Syria
- Country: Syria
- Governorate: Idlib
- District: Jisr al-Shughur District
- Subdistrict: Jisr al-Shughur Nahiyah

Population (2004)
  - Total: 595
- Time zone: UTC+2 (EET)
  - Summer (DST): UTC+3 (EEST)
- City Qrya Pcode: C4208

Jannet Elqora (Arabic: جنة القرى) is a Syrian village located in Jisr al-Shughur Nahiyah in Jisr al-Shughur District, Idlib. According to the Syria Central Bureau of Statistics (CBS), Jannet Elqora had a population of 595 in the 2004 census.
