= Shughur Tahtani =

Shughur Tahtani شغور تحتاني
- Village
- Location in Syria
- Coordinates: 35°49′50″N 36°20′33″E
- Country: Syria
- Governorate: Idlib
- District: Jisr al-Shughur District
- Subdistrict: Jisr al-Shughur Nahiyah

Population (2004)
  - Total: 1,599
- Time zone: UTC+2 (EET)
  - Summer (DST): UTC+3 (EEST)
- City Qrya Pcode: N/A

Shughur Tahtani (Arabic: شغور تحتاني), also known as Ain al-Souda or Arzghan Tahtani, is a Syrian village located in Jisr al-Shughur Nahiyah in Jisr al-Shughur District, Idlib. According to the Syria Central Bureau of Statistics (CBS), Shughur Tahtani had a population of 1599 in the 2004 census.
