= Zarzur =

Zarzur زرزور Zerzur
- Village
- Location in Syria
- Coordinates: 35°57′16″N 36°20′24″E
- Country: Syria
- Governorate: Idlib Governorate
- District: Jisr al-Shughur District
- Nahiyah: Darkush

Population (2004)
  - Total: 3,126
- Time zone: UTC+2 (EET)
  - Summer (DST): UTC+3 (EEST)

Zarzur (Arabic: زرزور, also spelled Zerzur, Zarzour or Zurzur) is a town in northern Syria, administratively part of the Idlib Governorate, located northwest of Idlib along the Syrian–Turkish borders on the western bank of the Orontes River. Nearby localities include nahiyah ("subdistrict") center Darkush to the north, al-Ghafar to the east, Kafr Dibbin to the southeast, district center Jisr al-Shughur to the south and al-Janudiyah to the southwest. According to the Syria Central Bureau of Statistics, Zarzur had a population of 3,126 in the 2004 census.

Zarzur has been identified as the Bronze Age town of Zuzzura (known as Zunzurha by the Hittites) of the kingdom of Alalakh. It is mentioned as Tundura in Thutmose III's list of settlements.

In the early 1960s it was described as a little village of 375 inhabitants. Although most of the inhabitants are Sunni Muslims, conversions to Shia Islam began in 1945 as a result of the missionary activities of Muhammad Naji al-Ghafri. Naji's work was supported by the embassy of Iran in the capital Damascus and included funding the construction of a hussainia, a congregation hall for Shia commemorations. The entire clans of Tarmash, al-Manjad and Asayyad became Shia Muslims. Presently, roughly 25% of Zarzur's population follow Shia Islam.

During the ongoing Syrian civil war, on 14 December 2012, a Shia mosque (hussainia) was set alight by opposition rebels from an Islamist unit of the Free Syrian Army. As sectarian slogan promoting civil strife was written on the wall of the building. Human Rights Watch condemned the targeting of the hussainia by rebel forces, as well as the government's apparent use of the building for military purposes. Following the torching of the hussainia, locals claimed Zarzur's Shia inhabitants fled the village fearing retaliatory attacks on the community as a result of their perceived support of the government.

== Bibliography ==
- Astour, Michael C. (1965). Hellenosemitica: An Ethnic and Cultural Study in West Semitic Impact on Mycenaean Greece. Brill Archive.
- Boulanger, Robert, ed. (1966). The Middle East, Lebanon, Syria, Jordan, Iraq, Iran. Hachette.
- Gordon, Cyrus Herzl (1990). The Bible world: Essays in Honor of Cyrus H. Gordon. Ktav Pub. House : Institute of Hebrew Culture and Education of New York University. ISBN 0870687581.
