= Athar, Idlib =

Athar, Idlib آذار
- Village
- Location in Syria Athar, Idlib (Middle East)
- Coordinates: 35°54′46″N 36°14′49″E
- Country: Syria
- Governorate: Idlib
- District: Jisr al-Shughur District
- Subdistrict: Al-Janudiyah Nahiyah

Population (2004)
  - Total: 821
- Time zone: UTC+2 (EET)
  - Summer (DST): UTC+3 (EEST)
- City Qrya Pcode: C4266

Athar, Idlib (Arabic: آذار) is a Syrian village located in Al-Janudiyah Nahiyah in Jisr al-Shughur District, Idlib. According to the Syria Central Bureau of Statistics (CBS), Athar, Idlib had a population of 821 in the 2004 census.
