= Andnaniyeh - Farjein =

Andnaniyeh - Farjein العدنانية فرجين
- Village
- Location in Syria
- Coordinates: 35°58′19″N 36°18′34″E
- Country: Syria
- Governorate: Idlib
- District: Jisr al-Shughur District
- Subdistrict: Darkush Nahiyah

Population (2004)
  - Total: 517
- Time zone: UTC+2 (EET)
  - Summer (DST): UTC+3 (EEST)
- City Qrya Pcode: C4248

Andnaniyeh - Farjein (Arabic: العدنانية فرجين) is a Syrian village located in Darkush Nahiyah in Jisr al-Shughur District, Idlib. According to the Syria Central Bureau of Statistics (CBS), Andnaniyeh - Farjein had a population of 517 in the 2004 census.
