= Sheikh Sndian Tahtani =

Sheikh Sndian Tahtani شيخ سنديان تحتاني
- Village
- Location in Syria
- Country: Syria
- Governorate: Idlib
- District: Jisr al-Shughur District
- Subdistrict: Bidama Nahiyah

Population (2004)
  - Total: 687
- Time zone: UTC+2 (EET)
  - Summer (DST): UTC+3 (EEST)
- City Qrya Pcode: N/A

Sheikh Sndian Tahtani (Arabic: شيخ سنديان تحتاني) is a Syrian village located in Bidama Nahiyah in Jisr al-Shughur District, Idlib. According to the Syria Central Bureau of Statistics (CBS), Sheikh Sndian Tahtani had a population of 687 in the 2004 census.
