= Frikeh, Idlib =

Coordinates: 35.7589°N 36.3592°E

Frikeh, Idlib فريكة
- Village
- Location in Syria
- Country: Syria
- Governorate: Idlib
- District: Jisr al-Shughur District
- Subdistrict: Jisr al-Shughur Nahiyah

Population (2004)
  - Total: 3,261
- Time zone: UTC+2 (EET)
  - Summer (DST): UTC+3 (EEST)
- City Qrya Pcode: C4219

Frikeh, Idlib (Arabic: فريكة) is a Syrian village located in Jisr al-Shughur Nahiyah in Jisr al-Shughur District, Idlib. According to the Syria Central Bureau of Statistics (CBS), Frikeh, Idlib had a population of 3,261 in the 2004 census.
