= Armala, Idlib =

Coordinates: 35°54′N 36°13′E

Armala, Idlib ارملا
- Village
- Location in Syria
- Country: Syria
- Governorate: Idlib
- District: Jisr al-Shughur District
- Subdistrict: Bidama Nahiyah

Population (2004)
  - Total: 911
- Time zone: UTC+2 (EET)
  - Summer (DST): UTC+3 (EEST)
- City Qrya Pcode: C4227

Armala, Idlib (Arabic: ارملا) is a Syrian village located in Bidama Nahiyah in Jisr al-Shughur District, Idlib. According to the Syria Central Bureau of Statistics (CBS), Armala, Idlib had a population of 911 in the 2004 census.
