= Amud, Idlib =

Amud, Idlib عامود
- Village
- Location in Syria
- Country: Syria
- Governorate: Idlib
- District: Jisr al-Shughur District
- Subdistrict: Darkush Nahiyah

Population (2004)
  - Total: 828
- Time zone: UTC+2 (EET)
  - Summer (DST): UTC+3 (EEST)
- City Qrya Pcode: C4245

Amud, Idlib (Arabic: عامود) is a Syrian village located in Darkush Nahiyah in Jisr al-Shughur District, Idlib. According to the Syria Central Bureau of Statistics (CBS), Amud, Idlib had a population of 828 in the 2004 census.
