= Matleh - Batlaya =

Matleh - Batlaya المطلة بطلايا
- Village
- Location in Syria
- Coordinates: 35°53′27″N 36°24′28″E
- Country: Syria
- Governorate: Idlib
- District: Jisr al-Shughur District
- Subdistrict: Darkush Nahiyah

Population (2004)
  - Total: 330
- Time zone: UTC+2 (EET)
  - Summer (DST): UTC+3 (EEST)
- City Qrya Pcode: C4244

Matleh - Batlaya (Arabic: المطلة بطلايا) is a Syrian village located in Darkush Nahiyah in Jisr al-Shughur District, Idlib. According to the Syria Central Bureau of Statistics (CBS), Matleh - Batlaya had a population of 330 in the 2004 census.
