= Sheikh Sindyan Fawqani =

Sheikh Sindyan Fawqani شيخ سنديان فوقاني
- Village
- Location in Syria
- Coordinates: 35°45′13″N 36°17′3″E
- Country: Syria
- Governorate: Idlib
- District: Jisr al-Shughur District
- Subdistrict: Jisr al-Shughur Nahiyah

Population (2004)
  - Total: 130
- Time zone: UTC+2 (EET)
  - Summer (DST): UTC+3 (EEST)
- City Qrya Pcode: C4186

Sheikh Sindyan Fawqani (Arabic: شيخ سنديان فوقاني) is a Syrian village located in Jisr al-Shughur Nahiyah in Jisr al-Shughur District, Idlib. According to the Syria Central Bureau of Statistics (CBS), Sheikh Sindyan Fawqani had a population of 130 in the 2004 census.

As of 2019, the village had a population of 90.
