= Watba =

Watba وطبة
- Village
- Country: Syria
- Governorate: Idlib
- District: Jisr al-Shughur District
- Subdistrict: Jisr al-Shughur Nahiyah

Population (2004)
  - Total: 356
- Time zone: UTC+2 (EET)
  - Summer (DST): UTC+3 (EEST)
- City Qrya Pcode: C4220

Watba (Arabic: وطبة) is a Syrian village located in Jisr al-Shughur Nahiyah in Jisr al-Shughur District, Idlib. According to the Syria Central Bureau of Statistics (CBS), Watba had a population of 356 in the 2004 census.
