= Mudiah - Luksin =

Mudiah - Luxin المضيئة لوكسين
- Village
- Location in Syria
- Coordinates: 35°56′33″N 36°18′54″E
- Country: Syria
- Governorate: Idlib
- District: Jisr al-Shughur District
- Subdistrict: Al-Janudiyah Nahiyah

Population (2004)
  - Total: 350
- Time zone: UTC+2 (EET)
  - Summer (DST): UTC+3 (EEST)
- City Qrya Pcode: C4261

Mudiah - Luxin (Arabic: المضيئة لوكسين) is a Syrian village located in Al-Janudiyah Nahiyah in Jisr al-Shughur District, Idlib. According to the Syria Central Bureau of Statistics (CBS), Mudiah - Luxin had a population of 350 in the 2004 census.
