= Hseiniyeh =

Hseiniyeh الحسينية
- Village
- Location in Syria
- Country: Syria
- Governorate: Idlib
- District: Jisr al-Shughur District
- Subdistrict: Jisr al-Shughur Nahiyah

Population (2004)
  - Total: 450
- Time zone: UTC+2 (EET)
  - Summer (DST): UTC+3 (EEST)
- City Qrya Pcode: C4216

Hseiniyeh (Arabic: الحسينية) is a Syrian village located in Jisr al-Shughur Nahiyah in Jisr al-Shughur District, Idlib. According to the Syria Central Bureau of Statistics (CBS), Hseiniyeh had a population of 450 in the 2004 census.

The village was previously known as Shandarish, a name which is believed to be of Turkish origin.

As of 6 February 2025, all of the village's residents remained displaced due to the Syrian Civil War.
