= Bteibat =

Bteibat بطيباط
- Village
- Location in Syria
- Coordinates: 35.806389°N 36.278056°E
- Country: Syria
- Governorate: Idlib
- District: Jisr al-Shughur District
- Subdistrict: Jisr al-Shughur Nahiyah

Population (2004)
  - Total: 247
- Time zone: UTC+2 (EET)
  - Summer (DST): UTC+3 (EEST)
- City Qrya Pcode: C4195

Bteibat (Arabic: بطيباط) is a Syrian village located in Jisr al-Shughur Nahiyah in Jisr al-Shughur District, Idlib. According to the Syria Central Bureau of Statistics (CBS), Bteibat had a population of 247 in the 2004 census.
