= Sadiyeh - Bsentiya =

Sadiyeh - Bsentiya السعدية بسندتيا
- Village
- Location in Syria
- Coordinates: 35°56′20″N 36°25′12″E
- Country: Syria
- Governorate: Idlib
- District: Jisr al-Shughur District
- Subdistrict: Darkush Nahiyah

Population (2004)
  - Total: 621
- Time zone: UTC+2 (EET)
  - Summer (DST): UTC+3 (EEST)
- City Qrya Pcode: C4246

Sadiyeh - Bsentiya (Arabic: السعدية بسندتيا) is a Syrian village located in Darkush Nahiyah in Jisr al-Shughur District, Idlib. According to the Syria Central Bureau of Statistics (CBS), Sadiyeh - Bsentiya had a population of 621 in the 2004 census.
