= Ramliyeh =

Ramliyeh الرملية
- Village
- Country: Syria
- Governorate: Idlib
- District: Jisr al-Shughur District
- Subdistrict: Bidama Nahiyah

Population (2004)
  - Total: 155
- Time zone: UTC+2 (EET)
  - Summer (DST): UTC+3 (EEST)
- City Qrya Pcode: C4234

Ramliyeh (Arabic: الرملية) is a Syrian village located in Bidama Nahiyah in Jisr al-Shughur District, Idlib. According to the Syria Central Bureau of Statistics (CBS), Ramliyeh had a population of 155 in the 2004 census.
