= Bsheiriyeh =

Bsheiriyeh - Bello البشيرية بللو
- Village
- Location in Syria
- Coordinates: 35°51′17″N 36°24′21″E
- Country: Syria
- Governorate: Idlib
- District: Jisr al-Shughur District
- Subdistrict: Jisr al-Shughur Nahiyah

Population (2004)
  - Total: 2,490
- Time zone: UTC+2 (EET)
  - Summer (DST): UTC+3 (EEST)
- City Qrya Pcode: C4193

Bsheiriyeh - Bello (Arabic: البشيرية بللو) is a Syrian village located in Jisr al-Shughur Nahiyah in Jisr al-Shughur District, Idlib. According to the Syria Central Bureau of Statistics (CBS), Bsheiriyeh - Bello had a population of 2,490 in the 2004 census.

== Syrian Civil War ==
On 19 May 2015 and 3 June 2015, Syrian forces dropped chlorine barrel bombs on the village, leading to multiple injuries.
