= Maryamin =

Maryamin (Arabic: مريمين), also spelled Mreimin, may refer to:

- Maryamin, Afrin, village in northern Aleppo Governorate, Syria
- Maryamin, Homs, village in Homs Governorate, Syria
- Mariamme, Homs, ancient city and bishopric in Homs Governorate, Syria
- Maryamin, Idlib, village in Idlib Governorate, Syria
- Maryamin, Jabal Seman, village in southern Aleppo Governorate, Syria
