= Qaysiyeh =

Qaysiyeh القيسية
- Village
- Location in Syria
- Coordinates: 35.821111°N 36.399167°E
- Country: Syria
- Governorate: Idlib
- District: Jisr al-Shughur District
- Subdistrict: Jisr al-Shughur Nahiyah

Population (2004)
  - Total: 1,156
- Time zone: UTC+2 (EET)
  - Summer (DST): UTC+3 (EEST)
- City Qrya Pcode: C4206

Qaysiyeh (Arabic: القيسية) is a Syrian village located in Jisr al-Shughur Nahiyah in Jisr al-Shughur District, Idlib. According to the Syria Central Bureau of Statistics (CBS), Qaysiyeh had a population of 1156 in the 2004 census.
