= Msheirfeh, Jisr ash-Shughur =

Msheirfeh, Jisr ash-Shughur المشيرفة
- Village
- Location in Syria
- Country: Syria
- Governorate: Idlib
- District: Jisr ash-Shughur District
- Subdistrict: Jisr ash-Shughur Subdistrict

Population (2004)
  - Total: 830
- Time zone: UTC+2 (EET)
  - Summer (DST): UTC+3 (EEST)
- City Qrya Pcode: C4187

Msheirfeh (Arabic: المشيرفة) is a Syrian village located in Jisr ash-Shughur Subdistrict in Jisr ash-Shughur District, Idlib. According to the Syria Central Bureau of Statistics (CBS), Msheirfeh had a population of 830 in the 2004 census.
