= Alyeh =

Alyeh العالية
- Village
- Location in Syria
- Coordinates: 35.7972°N 36.2644°E
- Country: Syria
- Governorate: Idlib
- District: Jisr al-Shughur District
- Subdistrict: Jisr al-Shughur Nahiyah

Population (2004)
  - Total: 408
- Time zone: UTC+2 (EET)
  - Summer (DST): UTC+3 (EEST)
- City Qrya Pcode: C4207

Alyeh (Arabic: العالية) is a Syrian village located in Jisr al-Shughur Nahiyah in Jisr al-Shughur District, Idlib. According to the Syria Central Bureau of Statistics (CBS), Alyeh had a population of 408 at the 2004 census.

As of 6 February 2025, the village's original inhabitants remain displaced due to the Syrian Civil War, with the only current residents being 38 IDPs from Hama and Idlib.
