= Marj Akhdar Gharbi =

Marj Akhdar Gharbi MishMishan المرج الأخضر الغربي مشمشان
- Village
- Location in Syria
- Country: Syria
- Governorate: Idlib
- District: Jisr al-Shughur District
- Subdistrict: Jisr al-Shughur Nahiyah

Population (2004)
  - Total: 3,464
- Time zone: UTC+2 (EET)
  - Summer (DST): UTC+3 (EEST)
- City Qrya Pcode: C4212

Marj Akhdar Gharbi MishMishan (Arabic: المرج الأخضر الغربي مشمشان) is a Syrian village located in Jisr al-Shughur Nahiyah in Jisr al-Shughur District, Idlib. According to the Syria Central Bureau of Statistics (CBS), Marj Akhdar Gharbi had a population of 3464 in the 2004 census.
