= Shaturiyeh =

Coordinates: 35.8603°N 36.2358°E

Shaturiyeh الشاتورية
- Village
- Location in Syria
- Country: Syria
- Governorate: Idlib
- District: Jisr al-Shughur District
- Subdistrict: Bidama Nahiyah

Population (2004)
  - Total: 739
- Time zone: UTC+2 (EET)
  - Summer (DST): UTC+3 (EEST)
- City Qrya Pcode: C4232

Shaturiyeh (Arabic: الشاتورية) is a Syrian village located in Bidama Nahiyah in Jisr al-Shughur District, Idlib. According to the Syria Central Bureau of Statistics (CBS), Shaturiyeh had a population of 739 in the 2004 census.
