= Baksariya =

Baksariya بكسريا
- Village
- Location in Syria
- Coordinates: 35°52′N 36°13′E
- Country: Syria
- Governorate: Idlib
- District: Jisr al-Shughur District
- Subdistrict: Bidama Nahiyah

Population (2004)
  - Total: 732
- Time zone: UTC+2 (EET)
  - Summer (DST): UTC+3 (EEST)
- City Qrya Pcode: C4223

Baksariya (Arabic: بكسريا) is a Syrian village located in Bidama Nahiyah in Jisr al-Shughur District, Idlib. According to the Syria Central Bureau of Statistics (CBS), Baksariya had a population of 732 in the 2004 census. As of 15 April 2025, the village had a population of 2,317.
