= Ein Elsoda =

Coordinates: 35.8161°N 36.3394°E

Ein Elsoda عين السودة
- Village
- Location in Syria
- Country: Syria
- Governorate: Idlib
- District: Jisr al-Shughur District
- Subdistrict: Jisr al-Shughur Nahiyah

Population (2004)
  - Total: 2,947
- Time zone: UTC+2 (EET)
  - Summer (DST): UTC+3 (EEST)
- City Qrya Pcode: C4204

Ein Elsoda (Arabic: عين السودة) is a Syrian village located in Jisr al-Shughur Nahiyah in Jisr al-Shughur District, Idlib. According to the Syria Central Bureau of Statistics (CBS), Ein Elsoda had a population of 2947 in the 2004 census.
