= Hallouz =

Hallouz حللوز
- Village
- Location in Syria
- Coordinates: 35°47′0″N 36°16′26″E
- Country: Syria
- Governorate: Idlib
- District: Jisr al-Shughur District
- Subdistrict: Jisr al-Shughur Nahiyah

Population (2004)
  - Total: 547
- Time zone: UTC+2 (EET)
  - Summer (DST): UTC+3 (EEST)
- City Qrya Pcode: C4188

Hallouz (Arabic: حللوز) is a Christian village located in Jisr al-Shughur Nahiyah in Jisr al-Shughur District, Idlib. According to the Syria Central Bureau of Statistics (CBS), Hallouz had a population of 547 in the 2004 census. Its inhabitants are predominantly Christians with the Greek Orthodox Church.

The village became uninhabited during the Syrian civil war.
