= Maalaqa - Bishlamon =

Maalaqa - Bishlamon المعلقة بشلامون
- Village
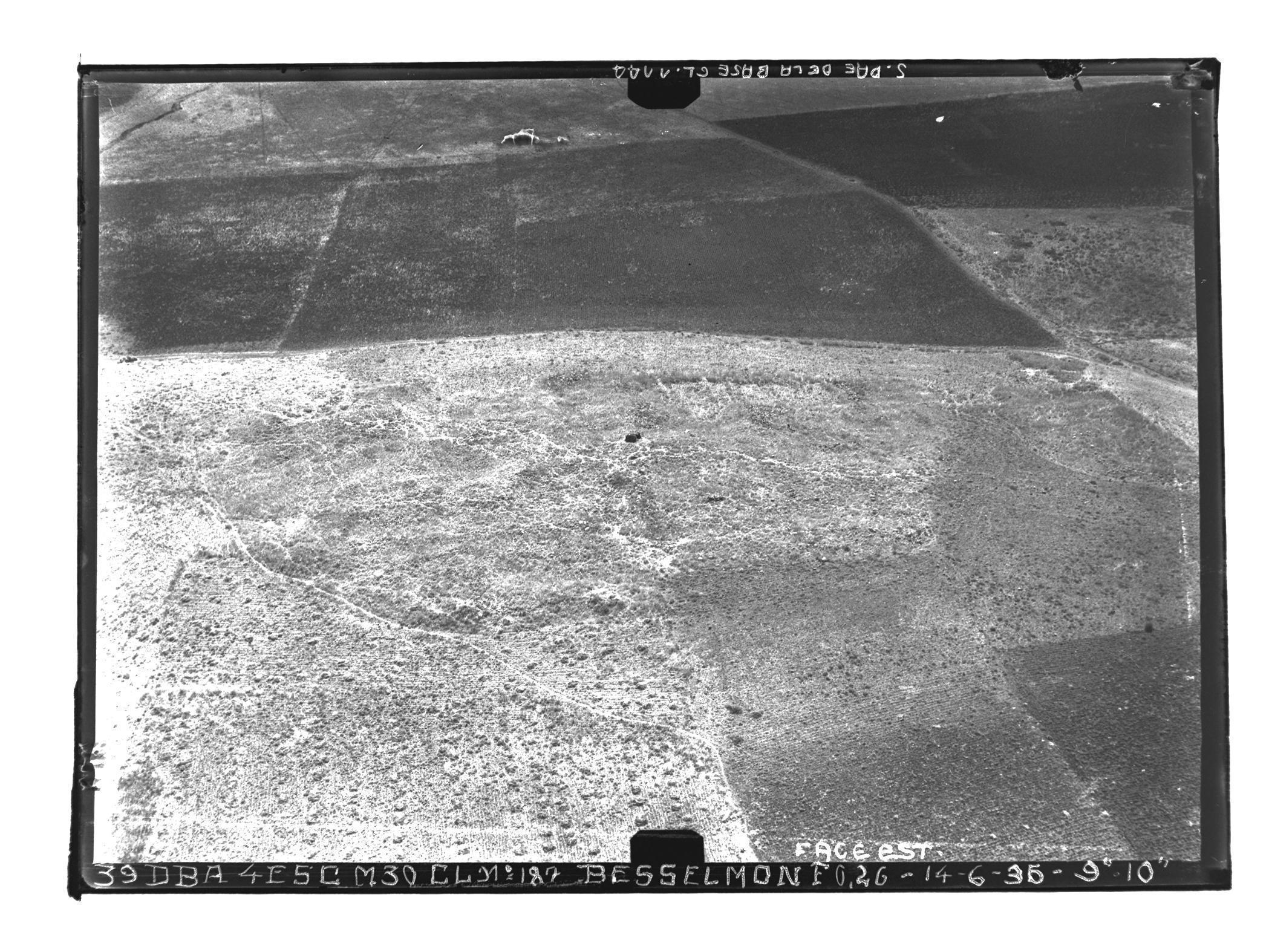
- 1935 aerial view of Bishlamon

- Location in Syria
- Coordinates: 35.8008°N 36.3719°E
- Country: Syria
- Governorate: Idlib
- District: Jisr al-Shughur District
- Subdistrict: Jisr al-Shughur Nahiyah

Population (2004)
  - Total: 2,841
- Time zone: UTC+2 (EET)
  - Summer (DST): UTC+3 (EEST)
- City Qrya Pcode: C4190

Maalaqa - Bishlamon (Arabic: المعلقة بشلامون) is a Syrian village located in Jisr al-Shughur Nahiyah in Jisr al-Shughur District, Idlib. According to the Syria Central Bureau of Statistics (CBS), Maalaqa - Bishlamon had a population of 2,841 in the 2004 census.
