= Maryamin, Idlib =

Maryamin مريمين
- Village
- Location of Maryamin in Syria
- Coordinates: 35°55′08″N 36°24′47″E
- Country: Syria
- Governorate: Idlib
- District: Jisr al-Shughur
- Subdistrict: Darkush
- Elevation: 394 m (1,293 ft)

Population (2004)
  - Total: 1,923
- Time zone: UTC+2 (EET)
  - Summer (DST): UTC+3 (EEST)
- Geocode: C4254

Mreimin (Arabic: مريمين) is a village in Idlib Governorate, Syria. Administratively, the village belongs to Nahiya Darkush in Jisr al-Shughur District. In the 2004 census, Mreimin had a population of 1923.
