= Al-Ghassaniyah =

Al-Ghassaniyah could refer to the following places:

- Al-Ghassaniyah, Homs, Syria
- Al-Ghassaniyah, Idlib, Syria
- Ghassaniyeh, Lebanon
