= Kidnapping of Shiraaz Mohamed =

Shiraaz Mohamed
- Disappeared: April 2017; Darkoush
- Status: Returned 2019

Shiraaz Mohamed is a South African activist and journalist best known for his kidnap in Syria while volunteering for the non-profit group Gift of the Givers in April 2017. He travelled to Syria as a photojournalist in 2017, and was captured by terrorists in Darkoush while attempting to travel towards the Turkish border. in 2019 he escaped from his captors, and he has since returned home and been reunited with his family.

== Capture ==
Shiraaz Mohamed was captured by ISIS militants alongside two drivers in Darkoush in April 2017. The drivers were almost immediately released, however Mohamed was kept to be utilised as a bargaining chip. These militants released a proof of life video in 2019 to assert their demands. They were extensive; a sum of US$1.5 million was touted for his release (25490100.00 RAND). The group was unable to procure any of this money. Mohamed managed to escape in December 2019, and provided an account of this experience in 2020.

== Escape ==
Shiraaz managed to escape from captivity in December 2019. This escape was not without its tribulations, however. On December 14, 2019, Mohamed managed to wriggle out of an iron grate that provided airflow into the bunker in which he was kept. Subsequent to this, Mohamed managed over the following days to navigate difficult terrain, including multiple "mountains" before coming across locals in a small village. His first few encounters with the locals were somewhat hostile - which Mohamed chalks down to his lack of knowledge of Arabic and his reluctance to state that he was kidnapped. However, after a while he met some "friendly" individuals who informed the "police", who verified he had indeed been kidnapped. Mohamed was then transported to Turkey and later the Turkish intelligence agency returned him to South Africa, where he was reunited with his family.

== See also ==
- List of kidnappings
