= Iblin, Syria =

Iblin إبلين
- Village
- Location in Syria
- Coordinates: 35°42′58″N 36°31′09″E
- Country: Syria
- Governorate: Idlib
- District: Ariha
- Subdistrict: Ihsim

Population (2004)
  - Total: 2,949
- Time zone: UTC+2 (EET)
  - Summer (DST): +3
- City Qrya Pcode: C4292

Iblin (Arabic: أبلين), also spelled Ibleen, is a village in the Arihah District in the Idlib Governorate in Syria. It is located in the Zawiya Mountain. According to the Syria Central Bureau of Statistics (CBS), Iblin had a population of 2,949 in the 2004 census.

== Syrian Civil War ==
Hussein Harmoush, the Syrian military officer who famously was among the first to defect from the Ba’athist Syrian army and who founded the Free Officers Movement during the early stages of the Syrian Civil War, was born and raised in the village of Iblin.

During the later years of the Syrian Civil War, the village became occupied by Tahrir al-Sham (HTS), a Jihadist opposition faction. After the Syrian Army's 'Dawn of Idlib 2' campaign in 2020, the village became situated near the frontline of fighting in the area.

On 10 June 2021, 4 civilians and 9 Tahrir al-Sham fighters were killed in a Syrian army rocket attack on the village. The spokesperson of the military wing of HTS, Abu Khaled al-Shamy and the media coordinator in the HTS military media department, Abu Mosa’ab were both killed.
