= June 2011 Jisr ash-Shughur clashes =

Early battle during the Syrian civil war

Coordinates: 35.8000°N 36.3167°E

- Part of the Syrian revolution and the Syrian civil war
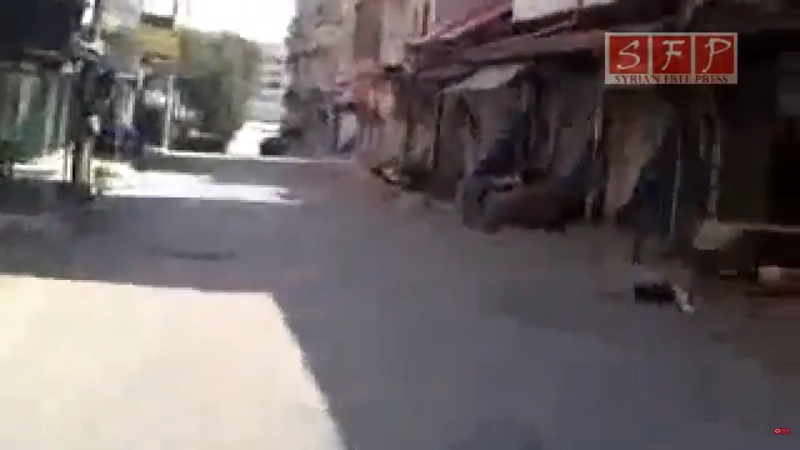
- General strike in Jisr ash-Shughur on 7 June 2011.
Date	4–12 June 2011 (1 week and 1 day)
Location	Jisr ash-Shughur, Syria
Result	Syrian government victory: Ba'athist security forces establish control over the city; Full-scale armed escalation of the Syrian Civil War

Belligerents
Syrian Opposition; Free Officers Movement; Armed locals; Opposition protesters	(Syria) Syrian Government

Commanders and leaders
Lt. Col. Hussein Harmoush; "Mohammad"	Brig. Gen. Sharif

Units involved
Mohammad's group Other local militias, supported by defected soldiers	Syrian Armed Forces; Syrian Army; 4th Armoured Division; 35th SF Regiment; 46th SF Regiment 55th SF Regiment; 76th Brigade; 85th Brigade; Syrian Air Force; Syrian police; Intelligence agencies; General Intelligence; Political Security; Military Intelligence; Shabiha

Strength
c. 2,000 (disputed)	Thousands

Casualties and losses
172 killed, 2,000 arrested (opposition claim)	120–140 killed (government claim)

In June 2011, during the civil uprising phase of the Syrian Civil War, rebels seized the city of Jisr ash-Shughur, resulting in violent clashes with the Syrian security forces, including the military. The exact reasons of the fighting, the course of events, and the resulting destruction and deaths are disputed. The government claimed that it clashed with Islamist-leaning insurgents who had set up an ambush for security forces, while the Syrian opposition described the Jisr ash-Shughur clashes as crackdown against pro-democracy protesters, resulting in a mutiny among the soldiers and a large battle with many people being massacred by pro-government forces. The fighting in the city lasted from 4 June until 12 June 2011.

== Prelude ==
Syrian security forces allegedly open fire on protestors in Jisr ash-Shughur on 5 May 2011.

Protests in Idlib Governorate, where Jisr ash-Shughur is located, became widespread in April 2011. These were quickly suppressed through the presence of "huge numbers" of policemen and intelligence agents. As time went on, however, new protests sprung up and spread to such a degree that the government could no longer contain them. This was especially problematic, as large parts of the Syrian security forces were already restive and unwilling to curb civil protests. The first protests also took place in Jisr ash-Shughur from 18 March, and quickly became regular events. The town was an "Islamist stronghold" and many locals hated the government because they had lost relatives during the Islamist uprising in Syria of 1979–1982.

The protests occurred without incident until 30 April when security forces arrested about 40 people who were subsequently tortured. Large protests on 2 May forced the release of the arrested. By this point, a small group of radical locals already prepared an insurgency. Their leader, only known as Mohammad, enlisted the help of six Salafists from Latakia. These men successively attacked a dozen small police stations around the town, capturing some guns and policemen. They allowed the latter to leave. On 13 May, large demonstrations erupted in violence, as protestors set fire to the city's Baʻath Party office.

On 3 June, about 30,000 protestors marched in Jisr ash-Shughur. Security forces dispersed the crowd with tear gas and by firing into the air. That same day, a local family father, Basil al-Masri, was killed. Most believed that he had been shot during the demonstration. In fact, however, Basil al-Masri had been armed and was killed during an attempted attack on a security outpost near Jisr ash-Shughur's railway station. He was probably motivated by hatred for the government because his family had suffered greatly during the old Islamist uprising, and many of his relatives had been murdered by government agents. Regardless, he had not been a member of Mohammad's group and few knew that he had attacked someone when he was shot. People were outraged, believing that an innocent civilian had been executed.

== Clashes ==
=== Initial uprising ===
On 4 June, thousands turned up for Basil al-Masri's funeral. According to the Office of the United Nations High Commissioner for Human Rights, about 20,000 people gathered for the funeral. Unbeknownst to most, both Mohammad's group as well as government snipers were lying in wait. Eventually, Mohammad and his followers opened fire at the post office where the snipers were stationed. These responded by firing into the crowd, killing five or 14 and wounding dozens. One of those killed was Hassan Malesh who was holding a speech when he was shot. Panic erupted, and many promptly fled the town for Turkey. However, several mourners were armed, many of them from villages in the countryside who deeply hated the government because their families had been targeted during the purges of the 1980s. They assaulted the station, burning it and killing eight security officers. This marked the beginning of a full uprising.

The Syrian Air Force's helicopters promptly responded, and began to strafe the town. The rebels rushed to the local offices of the Political and State Security Directorates, close to the post station. The agents at these locations surrendered to the rebels who numbered hundreds by then, and were allowed to leave. In contrast, the Military Intelligence agents refused to give up, whereupon the insurgents shot at their office and threw dynamite at it. Some locals called for peace, but were ignored. Eventually, the irregulars used a bulldozer to bring a barrel with explosives to the building, thereby opening a path for the attackers. Some agents were killed in the firefight, others by the explosion, and at least one was executed when the rebels stormed the building. There were also claims that policemen had refused to open fire on protesters, whereupon these officers were executed by government loyalists. Pro-opposition activists, including the Syrian Observatory for Human Rights, said that 35 people were killed, including six police officers. According to a UN fact-finding mission,

The Mission obtained the names of 14 people killed on that day. One witness stated he took seven of the bodies in his car to his home village and placed them in the fridge of a vegetable shop, as the hospitals were under the control of security forces. According to a witness, 17 soldiers who refused these orders were killed by a senior security official. Some witnesses told the Mission that this official was later killed together with several other Alawite security personnel following their capture by protestors, while others said he was killed by a soldier.

According to researcher Tom Cooper, a local Syrian Army battalion mutinied during this time, allegedly in protest against the murder of unarmed locals. According to this version, secret police and intelligence agents promptly killed about fifty mutineers, but were then overwhelmed by the rest of the battalion. Shortly after the clashes in Jisr ash-Shughur, researcher Joshua Landis posted on his blog that there was little evidence for either the government or opposition narrative and no evidence of a wide-spread mutiny. Later on, several locals told Nadia Abouzeid that the story about the mutiny had been fake, and was spread to inspire a revolt. According to Abouzeid's account, an actual defector, Lt. Col. Hussein Harmoush had been selected to give this story weight. He proclaimed that he had come to Jisr ash-Shughur in hopes of defending civilians, and founded the Free Officers Movement to rally other soldiers to the opposition's cause.

We invented the story about the defections. We made a liar out of Hussein Harmoush. We had to explain how the regime men were killed.

— Mohammad, one of the insurgent leaders at Jisr ash-Shughur

In any case, rebels quickly seized control of Jisr ash-Shughur, taking weapons from the area's military bases and police stations. Some defectors from military units began to travel to the area, and pro-opposition sources claimed that up to 2,000 rebel soldiers eventually amassed in the town, declaring themselves "free". Landis said that their number was much smaller and most of the insurgents in Jisr ash-Shughur were armed civilians, supported by a small group of defected soldiers. The government sent a unit of about 120 soldiers and policemen to restore control over Jisr ash-Shughur. According to Abouzeid, they were ambushed and killed before it even reached the town around 6 June. Landis posted though that "contrary to the claims of Syrian authorities, 120 Syria soldiers do not seem to have been killed. A single mass grave turned up 10 dead soldiers. Four had their heads cut off. This would seem to have been done by the militia of Jisr, which had some success in fighting the soldiers initially sent to pacify them." According to Syrian state TV, one group of about 20 policemen was killed when responding to calls by locals who asked for help, stating that unknown gunmen were terrorising them. In another incident, rebels overran a police command center where they killed 82 members of the security forces. Syria TV claimed that a number of the bodies of policemen were mutilated with some of them being thrown into the river. Mohammad later told Abouzeid that he and his followers filmed themselves burying the dead loyalists, but portrayed them as victims of government suppression for propaganda purposes. The Syrian government released tapped phone calls which Landis said indicated - "If they can be taken at face value" - that the rebels had lured the government loyalists into an elaborate ambush: Women and children were sent to Turkey, while the men called the security forces for help only to attack them upon entering the city.

As violence escalated, than 4,000 locals fled to Turkey, many opposed to violence in general, others out of hatred for the government and fear of retribution by security forces. The government downplayed the exodus, claiming that the locals were just visiting relatives and that the military intended to rescue civilians who were used as human shields.

=== Counter-insurgency operation ===
Upon being informed of the events at Jisr ash-Shughur, the Syrian government resolved to crush the rebels at all cost, lest the uprising inspire more soldiers to revolt. It could not allow the spreading of rumours about the mass killing of security forces, talk of a mutiny, and the establishment of "liberated areas". The government thus switched to a full military response to the Jisr ash-Shughur crisis. It mobilized 4th Armoured Division elements (including the 555th Airborne Regiment) commanded by Brig. Gen. Sharif in Darʻā and sent them to Jisr ash-Shughur. These forces were bolstered by the 35th Syrian Special Mission Forces (SF) Regiment and the remnants of the 76th Brigade. As they advanced towards the town, the loyalists were temporarily stopped at the Orontes River because the rebels had blown up several bridges.

Syrian security forces eventually reached Jisr ash-Shughur on 8 June and took up positions at the town's sugar factory. It is disputed what happened next. Both the opposition as well as the government claimed that a fierce battle erupted. The insurgents reportedly offered heavy resistance, and the loyalists responded with extreme violence. They often executed captured rebel soldiers, killed numerous civilians, and burned parts of the town as well as surrounding fields. An army general claimed that the troops were only trying to find those responsible for the earlier deaths and denied that shelling or other attacks on civilians had taken place. Local loyalist civilians later claimed that the rebels had also burned the fields of government sympathizers. The attacking security forces reportedly suffered numerous casualties, forcing the government to send reinforcements in the form of the 46th and 55th SF Regiments and the 8th Brigade. Loyalist Shabiha militias were also employed. The Syrian Air Force used helicopters to bomb the city, weakening its defenses. This allowed the government forces to launch a final attack on 12 June, from the south and east, using up to 200 military vehicles, including tanks, as well as helicopters. According to Syrian state media, troops battled "army units and members of armed organisations taking up positions in the surroundings of Jisr ash-Shughur and inside it."

In contrast to these reports, local witnesses stated that the city was almost empty by the time security forces entered, encountering little resistance. According to Landis, the scale of the battle as well as the losses of pro-government troops might have been exaggerated by both loyalists as well as rebels for propaganda reasons. Syrian politician Bouthaina Shaaban, an advisor to President Assad, also stated that "only minor security operations" took place in the town. By the time Jisr ash-Shughur was secured, 50,000 people had fled the area. Most of the captured rebel soldiers and hundreds of civilians who had been arrested during the counter-insurgency operation "were never seen again".

== Aftermath ==
The Jisr ash-Shughur clashes led to widespread reports about alleged massacres in the town, resulting in growing national and international support for the Syrian opposition. The crackdown was also condemned by Turkey which consequently turned against the Syrian government, and increased its support for the armed opposition. Shaaban later alleged that Turkey had been part of the rebel-initiated "fear-mongering campaign", as it had set up refugee camps even before the fighting at Jisr ash-Shughur had begun. The government attempted to respond, and gave foreign delegates a tour of the town a few days after the clashes had ended. This had no impact on international opinion, and the visit by the delegates was ignored by mass media.

== See also ==
- Hama massacre
- Jisr ash-Shughur massacre (1980)
