= Al-Ghassaniyah, Idlib =

Al-Ghassaniyah الغسانية
- Village
- Location in Syria
- Coordinates: 35°48′54″N 36°15′40″E
- Country: Syria
- Governorate: Idlib
- District: Jisr al-Shughur District
- Subdistrict: Jisr al-Shughur Nahiyah

Population (2004)
  - Total: 389
- Time zone: UTC+2 (EET)
  - Summer (DST): UTC+3 (EEST)
- City Qrya Pcode: C4203

Al-Ghassaniyah (Arabic: الغسانية) is a Christian village located in Jisr al-Shughur Nahiyah in Jisr al-Shughur District, Idlib. According to the Syria Central Bureau of Statistics (CBS), al-Ghassaniyah had a population of 389 in the 2004 census. Its inhabitants are predominantly Christians, belonging to the Greek Orthodox and Catholic denominations.

== History ==
During the Syrian civil war, most of the village's original inhabitants were displaced, with many Christians fleeing to government-controlled areas.

In 2022, renewed efforts by Hay'at Tahrir al-Sham to re-establish relations with Christian communities in the Jisr al-Shughur area included visits by its leader Abu Mohammad al-Julani and measures aimed at restoring religious life.

By February 2025, the original inhabitants remained displaced, while the settlement became home to 95 IDPs from Latakia. Later in 2025, limited numbers of Christian families began returning to al-Ghassaniyah and nearby villages.
