= Jisr ash-Shughur massacre (1980) =

Syrian war crime

Jisr ash-Shughur massacre of 1980
- Part of Islamist uprising in Syria
- Location: Jisr ash-Shughur, Syria
- Date: March 9, 1980
- Target: Protesters
- Attack type: Mortar and rocket fire, execution
- Deaths: 150–200
- Perpetrator: Syrian Army Special Forces

The Jisr ash-Shughur massacre of 1980 occurred in Syria on 9 March 1980, when helicopter borne Syrian troops were sent into Jisr ash-Shughur, a town between Aleppo and Latakia, to quell demonstrators, who had recently ransacked barracks and party offices in town. A ferocious search and destroy mission ensued that left some two hundred dead, while scores of prisoners were ordered executed in field tribunals.

== History ==
Against a background of an Islamist uprising across Syria, inhabitants of Jisr ash-Shugur marched on the local Ba'ath Party headquarters and set it on fire. The police were unable to restore order and fled. Some demonstrators seized weapons and ammunition from a nearby army barracks. Later that day, units of the Syrian Army Special Forces were helicoptered in from Aleppo to regain control, which they did after pounding the town with rockets and mortars, destroying homes and shops and killing and wounding dozens of people. At least two hundred people were arrested. The following day a military tribunal ordered the execution of more than a hundred of the detainees. In all, about 150-200 people were said to have been killed.

== See also ==
- List of massacres in Syria
- Siege of Jisr al-Shughur
- Syrian civil war
