= Judayda (Al-Jisser) =

Judayda (Al-Jisser) جديدة الجسر
- Village
- Location in Syria
- Coordinates: 35°55′47″N 36°18′4″E
- Country: Syria
- Governorate: Idlib
- District: Jisr al-Shughur District
- Subdistrict: Al-Janudiyah Nahiyah

Population (2004)
  - Total: 407
- Time zone: UTC+2 (EET)
  - Summer (DST): UTC+3 (EEST)
- City Qrya Pcode: C4265

Judayda (Arabic: جديدة الجسر), also transliterated as Jdaydeh, is a Christian village located in Al-Janudiyah Nahiyah in Jisr al-Shughur District, Idlib. According to the Syria Central Bureau of Statistics (CBS), Judayda had a population of 407 in the 2004 census. It is an Orthodox Christian village.

== History ==
During the Syrian civil war, most of Judayda's original inhabitants were displaced, with many Christians fleeing to government-controlled areas.

In 2022, renewed outreach by Hay'at Tahrir al-Sham toward Christian communities in the Jisr al-Shughur area included visits by its leader Abu Mohammad al-Julani and measures aimed at restoring religious life.

In 2025, small numbers of Christian families began returning to Judayda and nearby villages following the fall of the Assad regime.
