= Maland =

Maland الملند
- Village
- Location in Syria
- Coordinates: 35°55′25″N 36°16′31″E
- Country: Syria
- Governorate: Idlib
- District: Jisr al-Shughur District
- Subdistrict: Al-Janudiyah Nahiyah

Population (2004)
  - Total: 2,551
- Time zone: UTC+2 (EET)
  - Summer (DST): UTC+3 (EEST)
- City Qrya Pcode: C4259

Maland (Arabic: الملند) is a Syrian village located in Al-Janudiyah Nahiyah, Jisr al-Shughur District, Idlib. According to the Syria Central Bureau of Statistics (CBS), Maland had a population of 2,551 in the 2004 census.
