= Maryamin Samaan =

Maryamin مريمين
- Village
- Location of Maryamin in Syria
- Coordinates: 35°59′01″N 37°07′26″E
- Country: Syria
- Governorate: Aleppo
- District: Mount Simeon
- Subdistrict: al-Hader
- Elevation: 321 m (1,053 ft)

Population (2004)
  - Total: 1,045
- Time zone: UTC+2 (EET)
  - Summer (DST): UTC+3 (EEST)
- Geocode: C1185

Maryamin (Arabic: مريمين, romanized: Mreimin) is a village in the southern Aleppo countryside, Aleppo Governorate, northwestern Syria. Located some 20 km (12 mi) south of the city of Aleppo and some 6 km (3.7 mi) east of al-Hader.

Administratively, the village belongs to Nahiya al-Hader in Mount Simeon District. Nearby localities include al-Jumaymah 2 km (1.2 mi) to the northeast, and Kafr Abid 4 km (2.5 mi) to the east. In the 2004 census, Maryamin had a population of 1,045.
