= Free Officers Movement (Syria) =

Syrian military defector group

- حركة الضباط الأحرار; Harakat ad-Dubbat al-Ahrar
- The flag of Ba'athist Syria used by the Free Officers Movement of Syria
- Leaders: Lt. Col. Hussein Harmoush (executed); Maj. Abdul Rahman Sheikh Ali † (Khalid ibn al-Walid Battalion commander); 1st Lt. Khaldoun Sami Zaineddin † (As-Suwayda Governorate commander); Capt. Qais al-Gueth (Daraa Governorate commander)
- Spokesperson: Lt. Col. Hussein Harmoush (POW); 1st Lt. Bassim Al Khalid
- Dates active: 9 June 2011 – mid-2012 (part of the Free Syrian Army since 23 September 2011)
- Split from: Syrian Armed Forces
- Merged into: Free Syrian Army
- Group: Khalid ibn al-Walid Battalion
- Active regions: Syria
- Ideology: Syrian nationalism Secularism
- Wars: the Syrian Civil War

The Free Officers Movement (Arabic: حركة الضباط الأحرار, Harakat ad-Dubbat al-Ahrar), also known as the Free Officers Brigade (Arabic: لواء الضباط الاحرار, Liwa ad-Dubbat al-Ahrar), was a Syrian rebel group that operated during the early phase of the Syrian Civil War in 2011. The group consisted of defected officers and soldiers from the Syrian Arab Armed Forces.

Unlike the Free Syrian Army led by Colonel Riad al-Asaad, which had links to the Muslim Brotherhood of Syria, the Free Officers Movement was a secular-leaning group. The movement joined the FSA on 23 September 2011, but continued to operate under the name of the Free Officers Movement until mid-2012.

== History ==
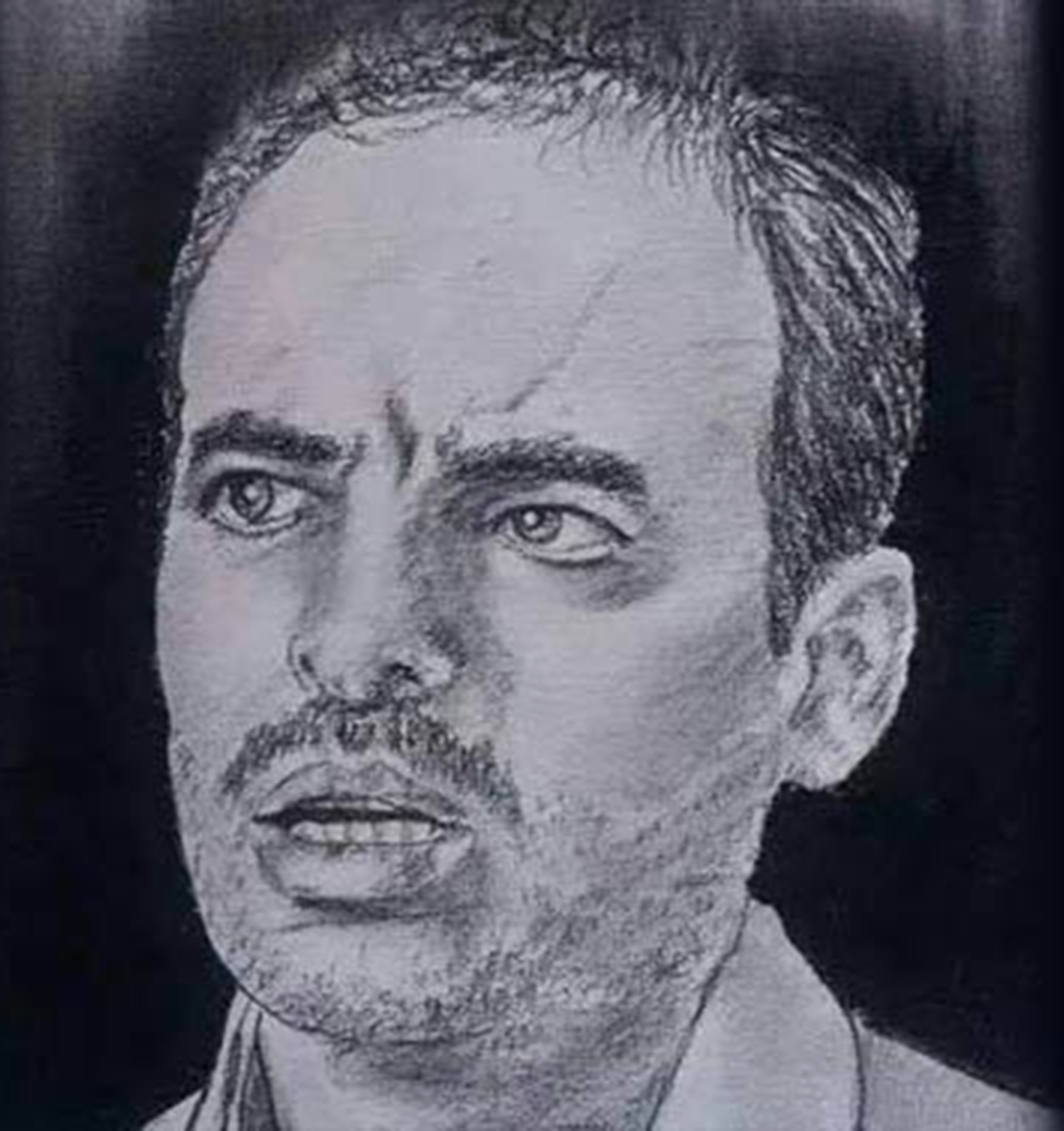
Lt. Col. Hussein Harmoush, founder of the Free Officers Movement of Syria.

The Free Officers Movement was formed on 9 June 2011 by Hussein Harmoush, a lieutenant colonel who defected from the Syrian Army. He, along with 30 other defected soldiers, aided other rebels and civilians during the June 2011 Jisr ash-Shugur clashes and helped them escape to Turkey. He himself fled to Turkey during the operation and lived in a refugee camp near the border with Syria. According to reports he covertly headed back into Syria several times between June and August. Col. Riad al-Asaad also joined the Free Officers Movement in July, before forming the Free Syrian Army. On 29 August 2011, Harmoush disappeared while in the camp.

On 15 September, he appeared on Syrian state television in an interview. He retracted his previous statements regarding Syrian security forces firing into crowds of protesters and accused the Muslim Brotherhood in instigating the conflict. However, activists claim that the statements came after torture and threats while Col. Harmoush was under detainment by the government.

Col. Riad al-Asaad of the Free Syrian Army demanded the Syrian government to release Harmoush and hand him back to Turkey, and threatened to "respond harshly ... through military operations" otherwise. Asaad also denied claims that Harmoush was captured by Turkish intelligence and handed over to Syrian military intelligence.

Harmoush was then detained at the Sednaya Prison. Conflicting reports by human rights organizations stated that he was either executed by the Air Force Intelligence Directorate by firing squad in January 2012 or continued to be imprisoned as of November 2013. According to the 2014 Syrian detainee report, Harmoush was among those who were killed in Sednaya.

The Free Officers Movement merged into the Free Syrian Army on 23 September. In late October 2011, First Lieutenant Khaldoun Sami Zaineddin, the first Druze officer to defect from the Syrian Armed Forces, joined the Free Officers Brigade.
