= Hussein Harmoush =

Syrian military defector (1972–2012)

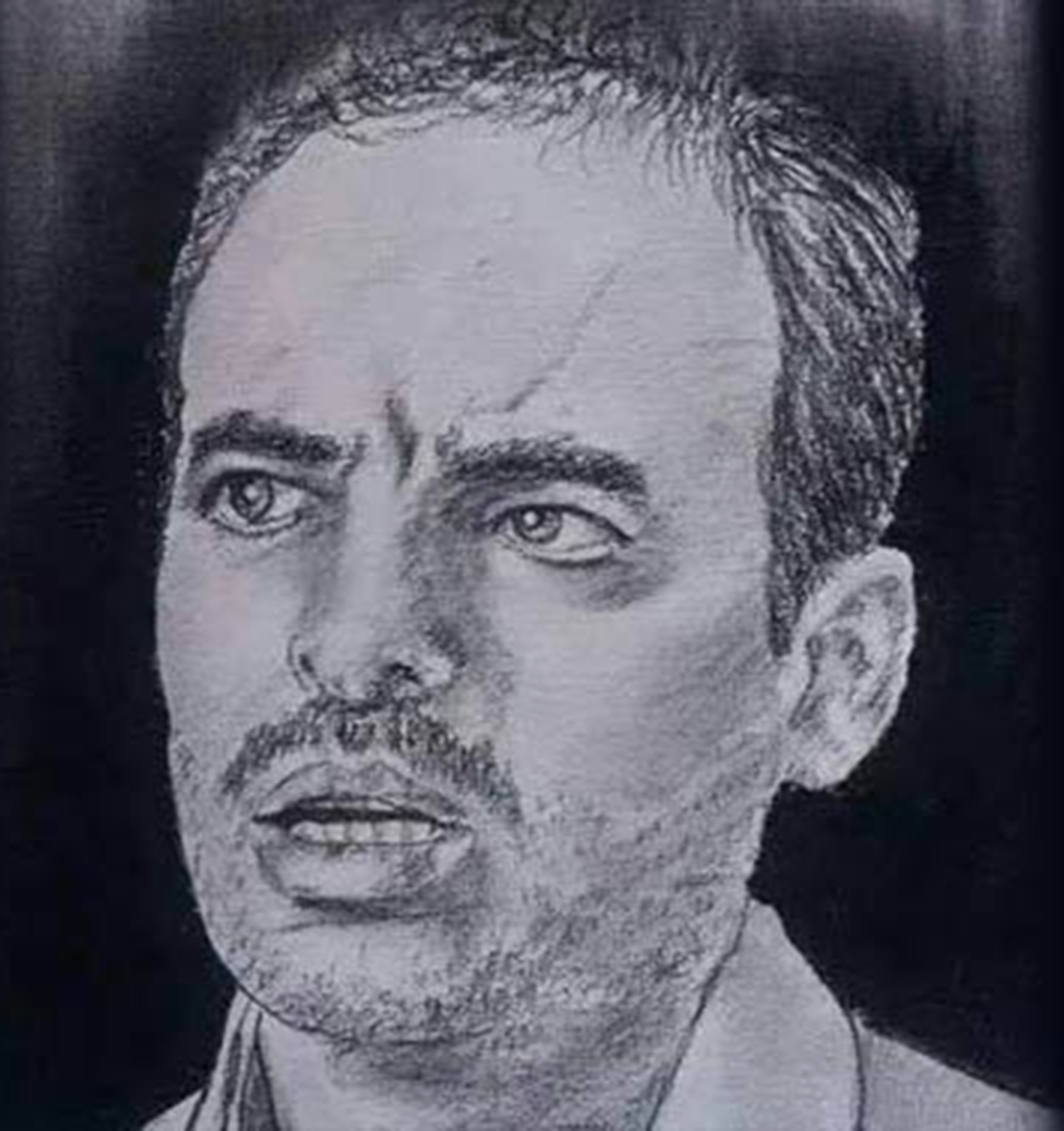
- Sketch of Harmoush
- Born: 25 May 1972; Iblin, Syria
- Died: 29 January 2012 (aged 39)
- Allegiance: Ba'athist Syria (until 2011) (Syrian opposition) Syrian National Coalition
- Branch: Syrian Army (until 2011) (Syria) Free Officers Movement (2011); Free Syrian Army (2011–2012)
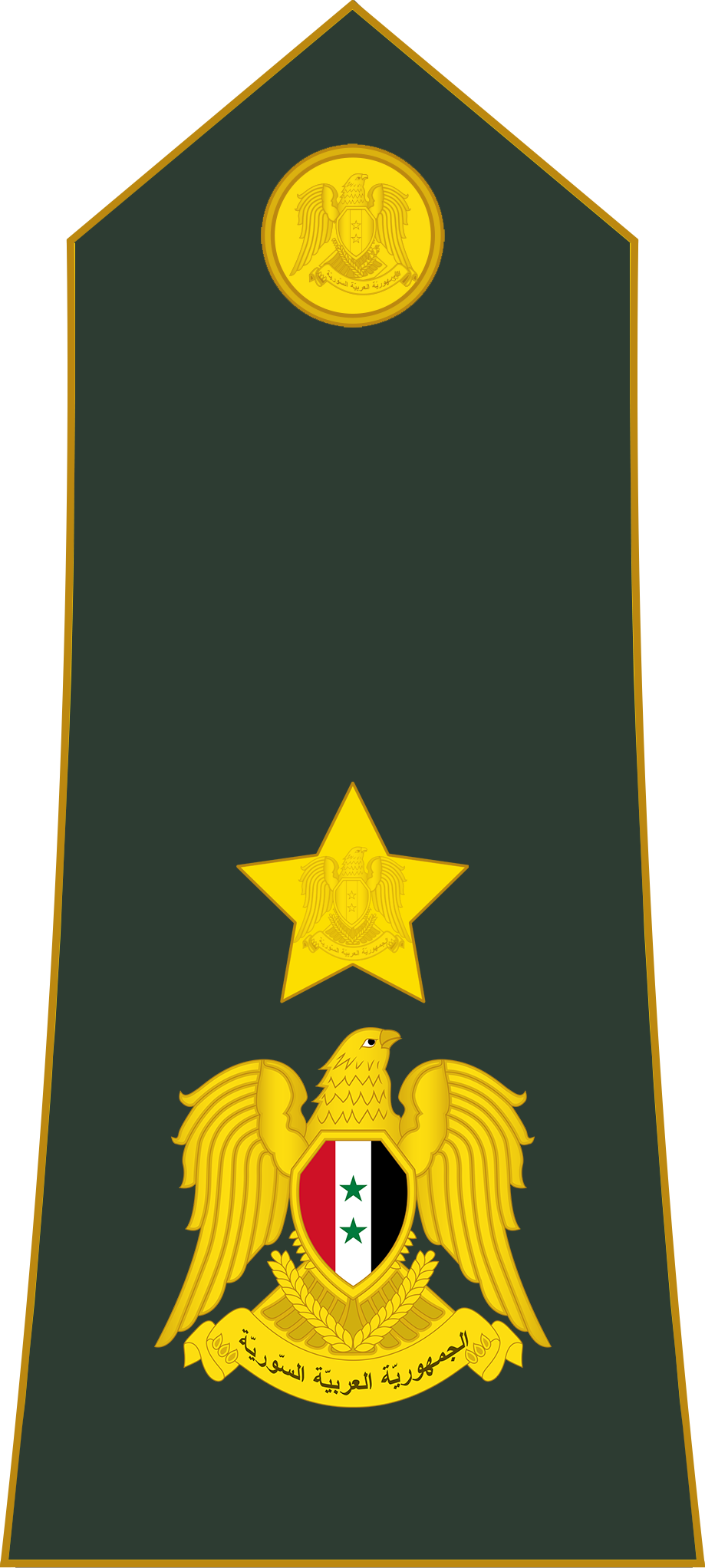
- Rank: Lieutenant Colonel
- Conflicts: Syrian Civil War

Hussein Harmoush (Arabic: حسين هرموش, romanized: Husayn Harmush; 25 May 1972 – 29 January 2012) was a Syrian military officer who was the founder and commander of the Free Officers Movement. He came to prominence after he defected from the Syrian Army and founded the rebel movement during the early uprising phase of the Syrian Civil War to protect civilians from the brutal crackdown against protesters by the Syrian government. He was later arrested in September 2011 and executed by the regime.

== The split and the founding of the movement ==
Hussein Harmoush was born and raised in the village of Ablin in the Jabal al-Zawiya region of the Syrian Idlib Governorate. His family, the Harmoush, is spread across the city of Idlib and several villages in Jabal al-Zawiya and al-Hawla in Homs, Douma in the Damascus countryside, the city of Jableh in Latakia, and the city of Tripoli and Sidon in Lebanon. During the years 1990–1996, he took a course in military engineering in the Russian Federation at the Higher Military Engineering Academy named after "Kubishov", where he obtained an excellent grade and obtained the technical red diploma. He also obtained a diploma in translation from Arabic to Russian and vice versa. He participated in scientific research at the level of the city of Moscow, and presented a thesis entitled "Calculating the protective thickness of tunnel facilities in the Syrian Arab country when affected by conventional weapons and weapons of mass destruction and in all types of soil", which is a computer program in the Pascal programming language. As for his graduation project, it was entitled "Design of a tunnel facility for a missile brigade, model /C_75/", which is the design of a facility in which missiles are loaded within the facility and three launch gates are prepared and then reloaded. The facility contains two entrances, three launch gates, the body of the facility, and accommodations for the crew isolated from the work area. The oxidizer and fuel facility were isolated from the rest of the facility sections. In 1996, he worked on the "Limestone Quarries-1" project in Damascus, and the following year he joined the "Limestone Quarries-2" project in Aleppo. In 1998, he was transferred to the “Bloudan-1” project in Damascus to work as an implementation engineer for a full year, and in the years 1999–2001, he moved to the 99/D project to work as a tunneling implementation engineer and a surveying engineer, during which he undertook various works related to construction works.

Later, Hussein Harmoush joined the Syrian army and became a lieutenant colonel in the 11th Division. However, after the outbreak of violent protests across the country in 2011, Hussein announced his defection from the army on June 10, 2011, during the campaign on the city of Jisr al-Shughour, along with a number of his comrades, justifying this by saying that it was due to “the killing of unarmed civilians by the regime’s forces.” Hussein Harmoush later said in a more detailed statement that he was sent to several cities during the protests, including Saqba in the Damascus countryside and Jisr al-Shughour in Idlib Governorate, and when the army began its second invasion on Sunday, June 5, he and a number of his comrades planted mines and placed obstacles in the army's path to slow its advance, but he had not yet defected at that time. Rather, he defected on Thursday, June 9, when he was transferred to Damascus, where he obtained leave from the army and used it to escape to Idlib Governorate, where he began organizing forces of defectors from the Syrian army.[2] Shortly after Hussein Harmoush defected, he announced the establishment of the Free Officers Brigade Movement and called on army soldiers to defect and join it. He then quickly announced his and his movement's responsibility for killing 120 security personnel in the city of Jisr al-Shughur on Tuesday, June 7. The authorities had previously reported that they had been killed by armed gangs, and he said that this had happened after security forces had attacked and terrorized civilians.

== His arrest ==
Later in June, Hussein Harmoush fled to Turkey and settled there, from where he continued to manage the operations of the Free Officers Brigade. However, on the morning of Monday, 29 August 2011, Hussein went to a meeting with Turkish security officials in a refugee camp on the Syrian-Turkish border. After going to this meeting, he disappeared under mysterious circumstances, and Syrian security forces were able to arrest him and smuggle him back to Syrian territory along with 13 other soldiers from the Free Officers Brigade. There are many conflicting accounts of how Hussein Harmoush was kidnapped and how he reached the hands of the security forces. Some accounts state that the Syrian security forces kidnapped him from inside Turkey after setting up an ambush for him and brought him into Syria, while others say that Turkey handed him over to the Syrian government without compensation. A third account says that he was part of a deal between the Syrian and Turkish governments in which Turkey exchanged Al-Muqaddam for nine members of the Kurdistan Workers’ Party that it wanted. The fourth account says that he did not leave Syria at all, but was arrested inside it during the army's invasion of border towns in northern Idlib Governorate. Despite these accounts, Turkey has categorically denied having any connection to the arrest. As for the security officials with whom Al-Muqaddam was supposed to meet, they said that they left him 10 minutes after the meeting began, and that they did not hear anything about him after that.

After Hussein Harmoush was arrested, the Syrian Army began an invasion of the village of Iblin in Jabal al-Zawiya, where the lieutenant colonel was born and where most of his family lives. Some believe that the reason for this invasion was to pressure him to retract his previous statements following his defection from the army. On the morning of Thursday, September 8, the army entered the village with a tank, seven armored vehicles, and dozens of cars carrying security personnel. These forces specifically targeted the homes of the Harmoush family. Hussein Harmoush's brother, “Mohammed,” was working at the time to help defectors from the army escape to Turkey, so there were 15 soldiers and two officers in his home when the invasion began. When the army entered the city, the tank began shelling the family's homes, including Mohammed's home, which caught fire and the soldiers began shooting at it. Seven soldiers were killed and five were arrested, while three soldiers and an officer managed to escape, along with Mohammed Harmoush. Following this operation, the army bulldozed 15 houses in the village, including houses belonging to the Harmoush family. In total, Hussein Harmoush's younger brother was arrested in Aleppo in July and has since disappeared. His other brother, Mohammed, was also arrested later after he and his brother-in-law fled and were returned dead after a while. Two of Hussein's other nephews were also arrested and were also returned dead. The last of his family to be arrested was his brother Walid Harmoush, who was arrested on October 5 after being ambushed in the village of Azmarin and whose fate remains unknown to this day.

Shortly after these events, the Syrian SANA news agency said on the evening of Thursday, September 15, that it would soon broadcast Hussein al-Harmoush's “confessions” about him and his movement. Indeed, Hussein soon appeared on the Al-Dunya satellite channel, saying that the army had never ordered him to shoot civilians, and that his defection was after “false promises” he received from opposition activists in Turkey, but that they later betrayed him and did not fulfill their promises, so he decided to return to Syria. Some considered that the presenter's face during the interview with him on Al-Dunya channel showed signs of severe torture he had been subjected to before the interview, and that many modifications and montages were introduced into the interview to show it in the way Syrian television wanted.
