= Kafr Debbin =

Kafr Debbin كفر دبين
- Village
- Location in Syria
- Coordinates: 35°55′15″N 36°21′30″E
- Country: Syria
- Governorate: Idlib
- District: Jisr al-Shughur District
- Subdistrict: Al-Janudiyah Nahiyah

Population (2004)
  - Total: 3,660
- Time zone: UTC+2 (EET)
  - Summer (DST): UTC+3 (EEST)
- City Qrya Pcode: C4267

Kafr Debbin (Arabic: كفر دبين; Syriac: ܟܦܪܕܒܝܢ, lit. 'Village of Bears') is a Syrian village located in Al-Janudiyah Nahiyah in Jisr al-Shughur District, Idlib. According to the Syria Central Bureau of Statistics (CBS), Kafr Debbin had a population of 3,660 in the 2004 census. In 1933, the population was 466 inhabitants.
