= Jisr ash-Shughur =

City in Syria

Jisr ash-Shughūr جِسْرُ ٱلشُّغُورِ Seleucobelus
- City
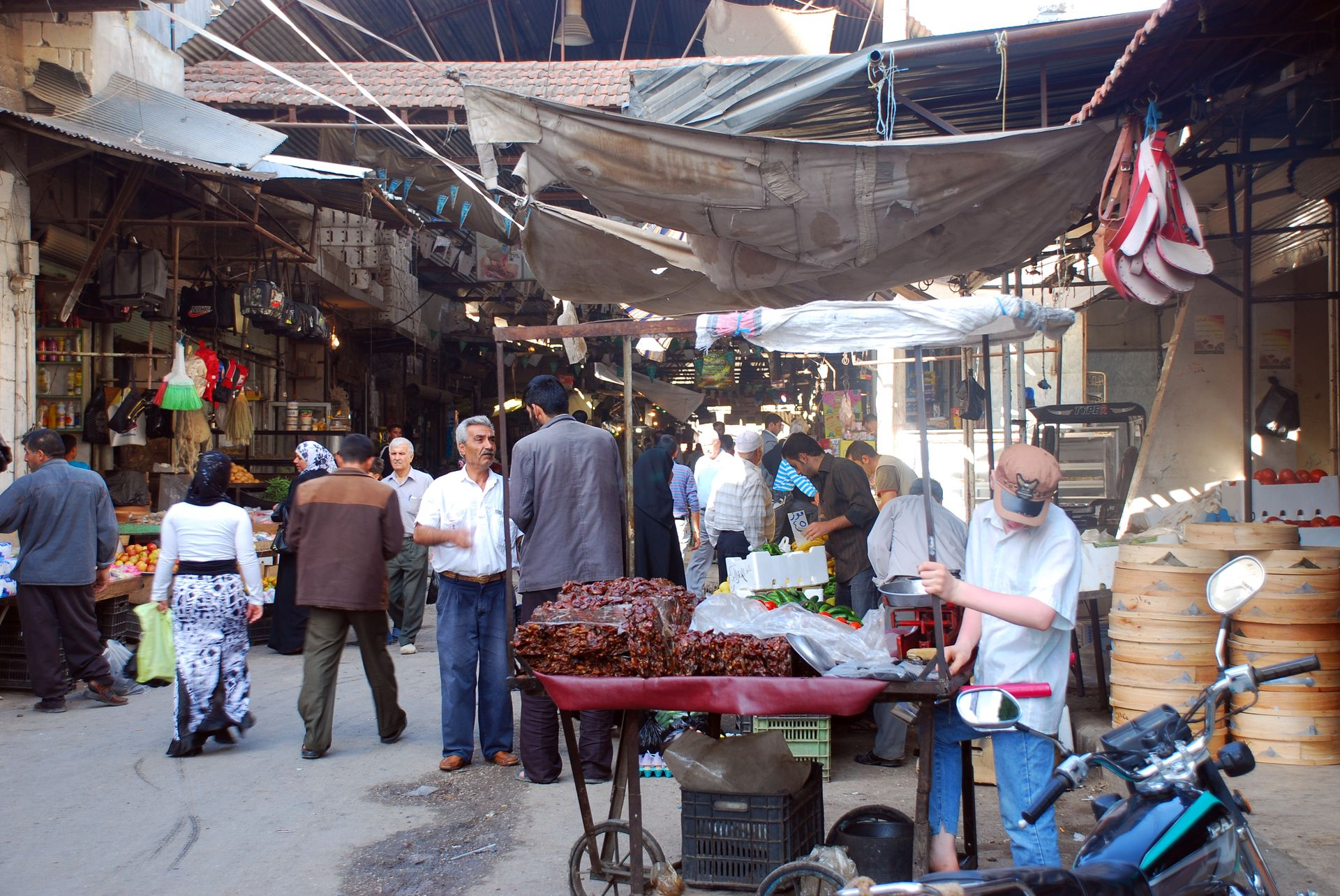
- Covered market in the old town of Jisr ash-Shughūr (2009)

- Location in Syria
- Coordinates: 35°48′45.3071″N 36°19′3.3791″E
- Country: Syria
- Governorate: Idlib Governorate
- District: Jisr ash-Shughur District
- Subdistrict: Jist al-Shughur Subdistrict
- Elevation: 170 m (560 ft)

Population
  - Total: 39,917 (2,004)

Jisr ash-Shughūr (Arabic: جِسْرُ ٱلشُّغُورِ, romanized: jisr aš-šuġūr, pronounced [dʒɪsr aʃ.ʃuˈɣuːr], also rendered as Jisser ash-Shughour and other spellings), known in antiquity as Seleucobelus (Greek: Σελευκόβηλος, romanized: Seleukóbēlos), is a city in the Idlib Governorate in northwestern Syria. Situated at an altitude of 170 metres (560 ft) above sea level on the Orontes River. The city was the headquarters of the Turkistan Islamic Party in Syria during the civil war.

== History ==
Jisr ash-Shughūr has long been an important stopping point on trade routes. It is situated on the main route between Latakia, which is 75 kilometres (47 mi) to the west, and Aleppo, which is 104 kilometres (65 mi) to the east. Located in the rich alluvial plain of the Ghab Plain on the eastern side of the Syrian Coastal Mountain Range, the area has been continuously inhabited for over 10,000 years.

The ancient city of Qarqar is thought to have been situated some 7 kilometres (4.3 mi) south of the modern town, which was established in Hellenistic times as the city of Seleucia ad Belum. The Romans called it Niaccuba and built a stone bridge there across the Orontes. During the Crusader era, Chastel Rugia was to the east, and another two castles formed the complex of ash-Shughr and Bakās to the northwest of Jisr ash-Shughūr to defend the region, until they were captured by Saladin in 1188.

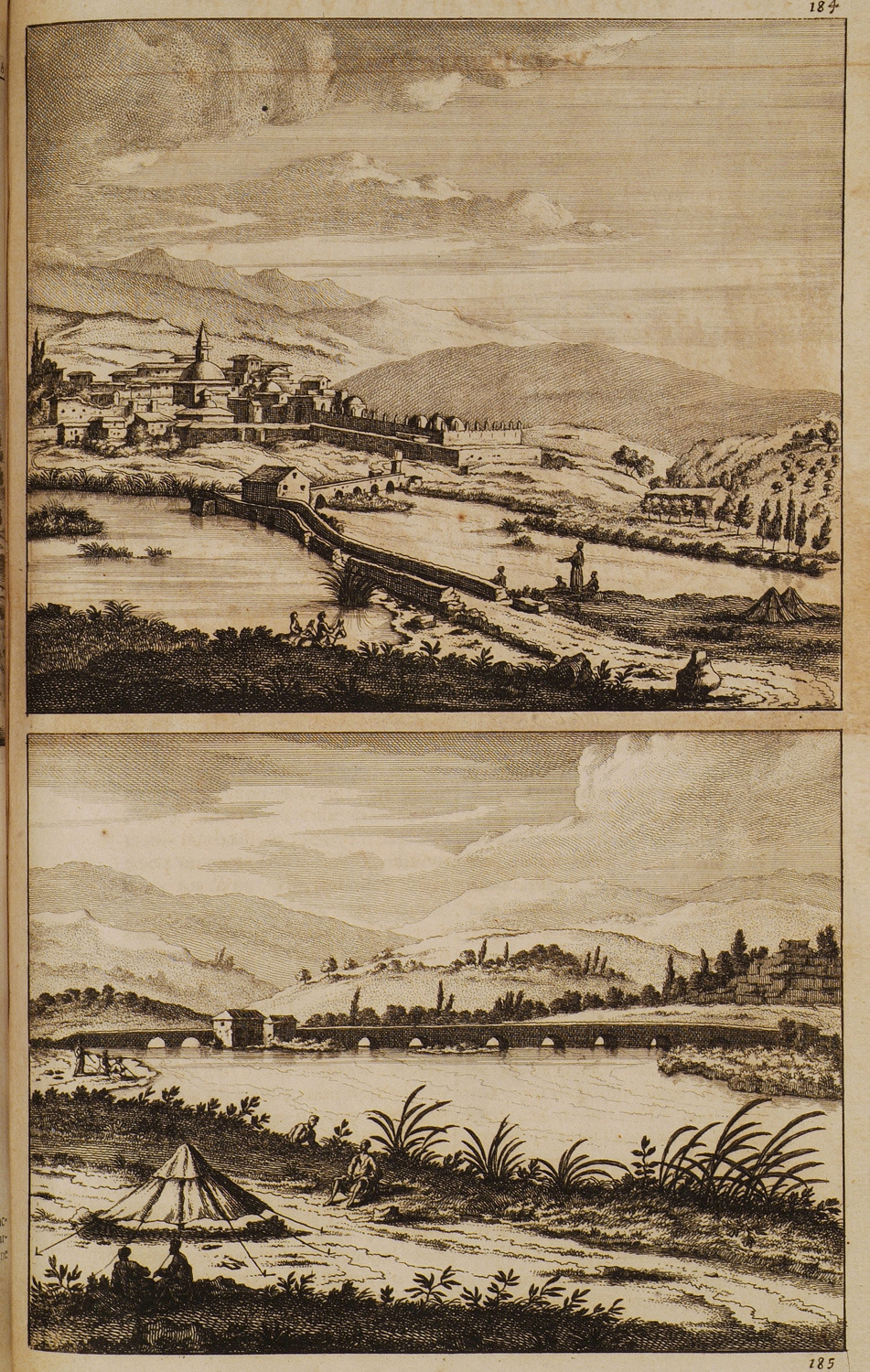
View of "Isser-Sjoor" (top) and view of the river and the bridge (bottom), by Corneille le Brun (Voyage au Levant, 1714)

Little remains of the ancient city other than portions of the much-repaired Roman bridge, which is now incorporated into a 15th-century Mamluk construction that still serves as one of the city's two bridges over the river. The bridge's V-shaped design was intended to enable it to withstand the force of the river's current. Although Jisr ash-Shughūr is mostly of modern construction, a number of old Ottoman-era buildings still survive, including a caravanserai built in the centre of the old town between 1660–75 and later restored in 1826–27. The town is referred to in 18th-century European sources as Choug, Shogle or Shoggle (the latter in the Encyclopédie).

During the Ottoman period, the town was often vulnerable to attack from the Kurdish tribes from the Sahyun district. For much of the 18th century, however, the town itself was controlled by the Kurdish agha (title) Muhammad ibn Rustum and his sons, first as kaymakam (deputy governor), then as mütevelli (manager) of the religious foundation of Köprülü Mehmed Pasha in Jisr ash-Shughūr. After the end of World War I, Jisr al-Shughur was the site of sustained resistance against the French occupation forces. In December 1920, the local rebel leader Ibrahim Hananu together with Kurdish bands from the Sahyun and with support of Kemalist insurgency forces from Turkey managed to seize the town from the French.

The city has been described as conservative and predominantly Sunni Muslim, with a history of unrest against the government of the ruling Alawite-dominated secular Arab nationalist Baʻathist party. It was the scene of a mass killing by Syrian security forces in 1980 that prefigured the later and more notorious Hama massacre during the nationwide Islamist uprising in Syria. On 9 March 1980, against a background of anti-government protests across Syria, inhabitants of Jisr ash-Shughūr marched on the local Baʻath headquarters and set it on fire. The police were unable to restore order and fled. Some demonstrators seized weapons and ammunition from a nearby army barracks. Later that day, units of the Syrian Arab Army Special Forces were helicoptered in from Aleppo to regain control, which they did after pounding the town with rockets and mortars, destroying homes and shops and killing and wounding dozens of people. At least two hundred people were arrested. The following day a military tribunal ordered the execution of more than a hundred of the detainees. In all, about 150–200 people were said to have been killed in a matter of hours.

=== Syrian civil war ===
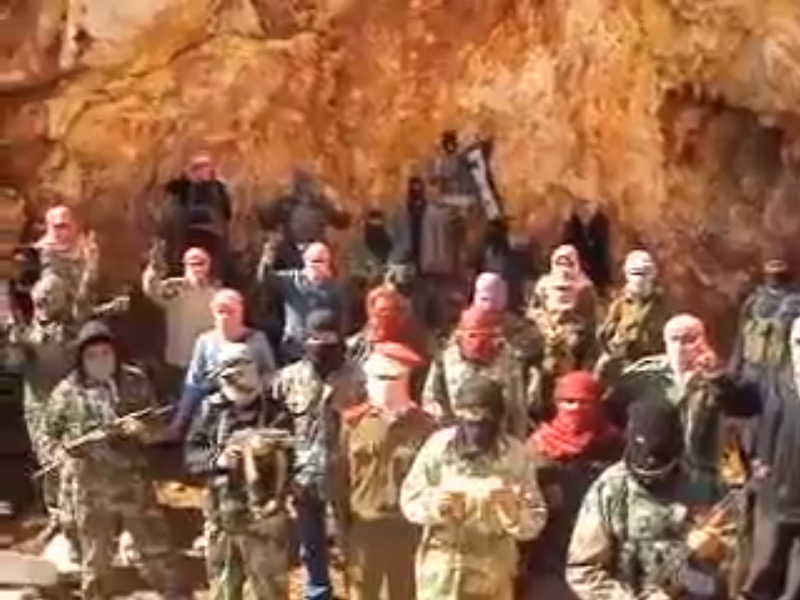
The Mujahideen Battalion, a unit of the Free Syrian Army, announces its formation in Jisr ash-Shughūr, March 2012.

Violence broke out in Jisr ash-Shughūr on 4 June 2011, three months into the Syrian civil war. Armed groups attacked local security forces, killed 120 members of the security forces, and seized control of the city, with many civilians fleeing to Latakia. Activists speaking to the BBC denied the government's version of these events, claiming that the cause of these deaths was unclear and may have been an internal mutiny. The Syrian Arab Army launched an operation in a crackdown against the allegedly guilty armed groups. The operation lasted until 12 June 2011. The city was reported to have been largely abandoned by its inhabitants, many of whom fled to neighbouring Turkey, as Syrian Arab Army units massed outside to retake it. Over December 2011–January 2012, the FSA took control, establishing a key rebel center. As of June 2012, the FSA was still in control, but by October 2012, the Syrian government was reported by Al Jazeera to be in control of the town. However, on 25 April 2015, the city was captured by a military alliance of Salafist insurgents, including al-Qaeda's al-Nusra Front, Ahrar al-Sham, and the Turkistan Islamic Party (TIP). The city has become a stronghold of the TIP, and reportedly 3,500 militant Uyghurs have since settled in the city.

By July 2017, the city was under joint control of Tahrir al-Sham and the Turkistan Islamic Party. Syrian government and Russian troops bombing of the city resumed in September 2017.

== Demographics ==
In 1933, the town was home to 2,328 people, 2,181 Muslims and 147 Christians. According to the 2004 census, the city was home to 39,917 inhabitants. Most of the population are Sunni Muslims, with a significant Christian minority (estimated at 3,000 people in 2010), mostly Greek Orthodox.

== Climate ==
Climate data for Jisr ash-Shughur
Month	Jan	Feb	Mar	Apr	May	Jun	Jul	Aug	Sep	Oct	Nov	Dec	Year
Mean daily maximum °C (°F)	12.3 (54.1)	14.3 (57.7)	18.6 (65.5)	23.2 (73.8)	28.2 (82.8)	31.7 (89.1)	33.0 (91.4)	34.0 (93.2)	32.0 (89.6)	27.8 (82.0)	20.7 (69.3)	13.5 (56.3)	24.1 (75.4)
Daily mean °C (°F)	8.5 (47.3)	9.6 (49.3)	13.1 (55.6)	16.7 (62.1)	21.2 (70.2)	25.6 (78.1)	28.1 (82.6)	28.2 (82.8)	25.2 (77.4)	20.2 (68.4)	14.1 (57.4)	9.3 (48.7)	18.3 (65.0)
Mean daily minimum °C (°F)	4.5 (40.1)	4.6 (40.3)	7.8 (46.0)	10.1 (50.2)	14.3 (57.7)	19.3 (66.7)	23.2 (73.8)	22.7 (72.9)	18.5 (65.3)	12.5 (54.5)	7.5 (45.5)	5.0 (41.0)	12.5 (54.5)
Average precipitation mm (inches)	148 (5.8)	125 (4.9)	87 (3.4)	47 (1.9)	18 (0.7)	8 (0.3)	0 (0)	1 (0.0)	11 (0.4)	35 (1.4)	55 (2.2)	147 (5.8)	682 (26.8)
Source: FAO
