= Bidama Subdistrict =

Bidama Subdistrict ناحية بداما
- Nahiyah
- Location in Idlib Governorate

- Location in Syria
- Country: Syria
- Governorate: Idlib
- District: Jisr al-Shughur District

Population (2004)
  - Total: 18,501
- Time zone: UTC+2 (EET)
  - Summer (DST): UTC+3 (EEST)
- Nahya pcod: SY070401

Bidama Subdistrict (Arabic: ناحية بداما) is a Syrian nahiyah (subdistrict) located in Jisr al-Shughur District in Idlib. According to the Syria Central Bureau of Statistics (CBS), Bidama Subdistrict had a population of 18,501 in the 2004 census. By July of 2023, the population had increased to 52,081, of which 36,210 (69.53%) were IDPs.
