= Al-Janudiyah Subdistrict =

Al-Janudiyah Subdistrict ناحية الجانودية
- Nahiyah
- Location in Idlib Governorate

- Location in Syria
- Coordinates: 35.9228°N 36.3039°E
- Country: Syria
- Governorate: Idlib
- District: Jisr al-Shughur District

Population (2004)
  - Total: 19,642
- Time zone: UTC+2 (EET)
  - Summer (DST): UTC+3 (EEST)
- Nahya pcod: SY070403

Al-Janudiyah Subdistrict (Arabic: ناحية الجانودية) is a Syrian nahiyah (subdistrict) located in Jisr al-Shughur District in Idlib. According to the Syria Central Bureau of Statistics (CBS), Al-Janudiyah Subdistrict had a population of 19,642 in the 2004 census.
