= Darkush Subdistrict =

Darkush Subdistrict ناحية دركوش
- Nahiyah
- Location in Idlib Governorate

- Location in Syria
- Country: Syria
- Governorate: Idlib
- District: Jisr al-Shughur District

Population (2004)
  - Total: 23,022
- Time zone: UTC+2 (EET)
  - Summer (DST): UTC+3 (EEST)
- Nahya pcod: SY070402

Darkush Subdistrict (Arabic: ناحية دركوش) is a Syrian nahiyah (subdistrict) located in Jisr al-Shughur District in Idlib. According to the Syria Central Bureau of Statistics (CBS), Darkush Subdistrict had a population of 23,022 in the 2004 census.
