= Jisr ash-Shughur Subdistrict =

Jisr ash-Shughur Subdistrict ناحية مركز جسر الشغور
- Nahiyah
- Location in Idlib Governorate

- Location in Syria
- Coordinates: 35°48′50″N 36°20′25″E
- Country: Syria
- Governorate: Idlib
- District: Jisr ash-Shughur District

Population (2004)
  - Total: 89,028
- Time zone: UTC+2 (EET)
  - Summer (DST): UTC+3 (EEST)
- Nahya pcod: SY070400

Jisr ash-Shughur Subdistrict (Arabic: ناحية مركز جسر الشغور) is a Syrian nahiyah (subdistrict) located in Jisr ash-Shughur District in Idlib. According to the Syria Central Bureau of Statistics (CBS), Jisr ash-Shughur Subdistrict had a population of 89,028 in the 2004 census.
