= Jisr ash-Shughur District =

Jisr ash-Shugur District منطقة جسر الشغور
- District
- Map of Jisr ash-Shugur District within Idlib Governorate
- Coordinates (Jisr ash-Shugur): 35°48′45″N 36°19′03″E
- Country: Syria
- Governorate: Idlib
- Seat: Jisr ash-Shugur
- Subdistricts: 4 nawāḥī

Area
  - Total: 610.89 km^{2} (235.87 sq mi)

Population (2004)
  - Total: 150,193
  - Density: 245.86/km^{2} (636.77/sq mi)
- Geocode: SY0704

Jisr ash-Shughur District (Arabic: منطقة جسر الشغور, romanized: manṭiqat Ǧisr aš-Šuġūr) is a district of the Idlib Governorate in northwestern Syria. Administrative centre is the city of Jisr ash-Shugur. At the 2004 census, the district had a population of 150,193.

== Sub-districts ==
The district of Jisr ash-Shughur is divided into four sub-districts or nawāḥī (population as of 2004):

- Jisr ash-Shughur Subdistrict (ناحية جسر الشغور): population 89,028.
- Bidama Subdistrict (ناحية بداما): population 18,501.
- Darkush Subdistrict (ناحية دركوش): population 23,022.
- Al-Janudiyah Subdistrict (ناحية الجانودية): population 19,642.
