= Farhat Square =

City square in Aleppo, Syria

Farhat Square ميدان فرحات
- City square
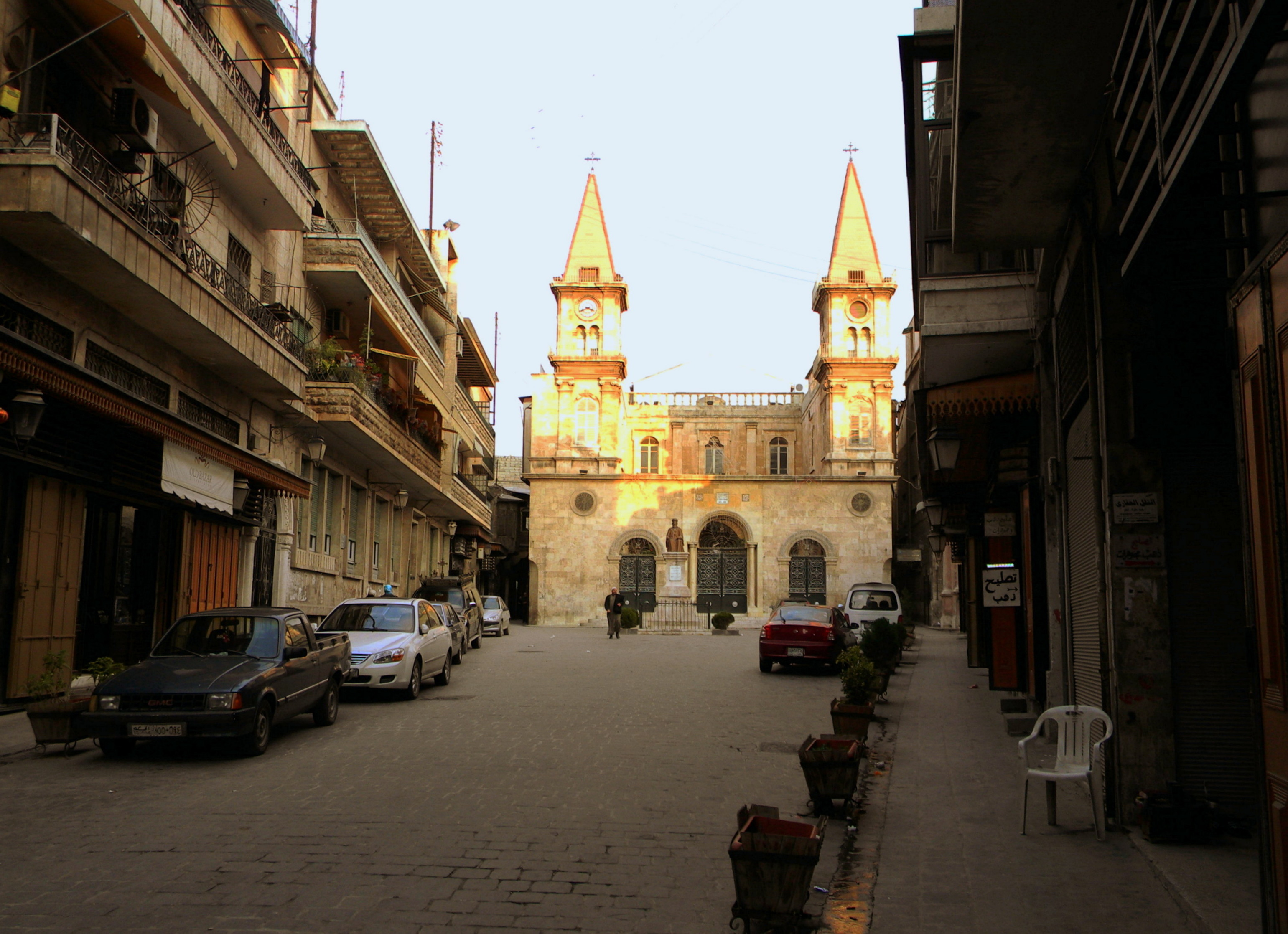
- Cathedral of St. Elijah in Farhat Square, Jdayde district
- Owner: City of Aleppo
- Location: Al-Jdayde, Aleppo, Syria
- Location in Aleppo
- Coordinates: 36°12′25.46″N 37°09′19.31″E

Farhat Square (Sahat Farhat) is one of the oldest squares in the Syrian city of Aleppo. It is located in the old Jdeydeh District, outside the historic walls of the Ancient City of Aleppo.

Farhat Square is a symbolic area of Christianity in Aleppo as three cathedrals are located there: Greek Catholic, Armenian and Maronite. Churches have been in the area since the 15th Century.

It was named after Bishop Gabriel Germanos Farhat (1670-1732) who was Maronite Bishop of Aleppo between 1725-1732 and founded the Maronite Library of Aleppo. Sahat Farhat was named in his honor and his statue was placed in the square in 1932 to commemorate the 200th anniversary of his death.

The square and the buildings around it have been damaged by heavy fighting between combatants during the Battle of Aleppo (2012–16). Similar destruction occurred to the area during Aleppo's sectarian unrest of 1850.

== Gallery ==
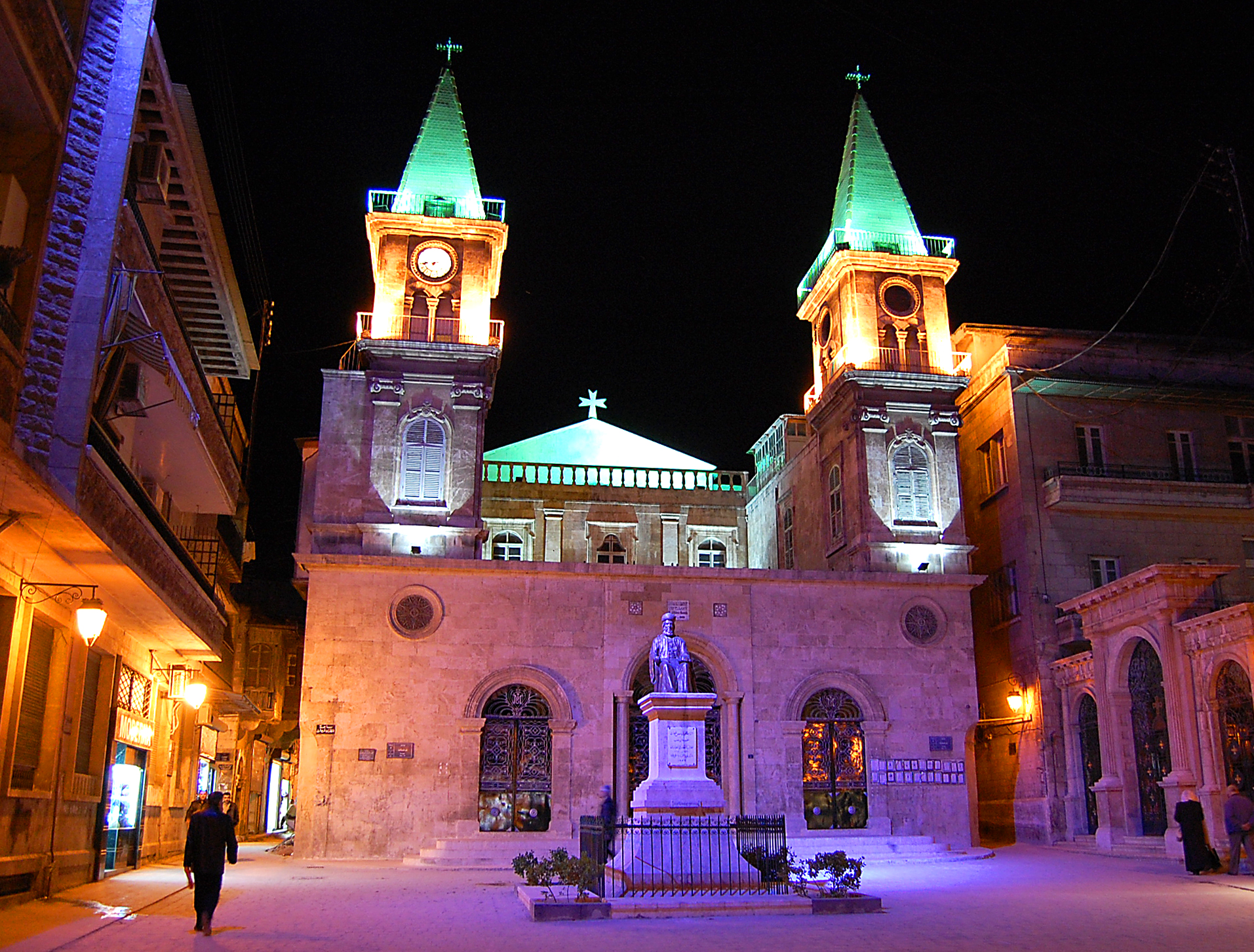
Aleppo's St Elijah Cathedral situated on Farhat Square

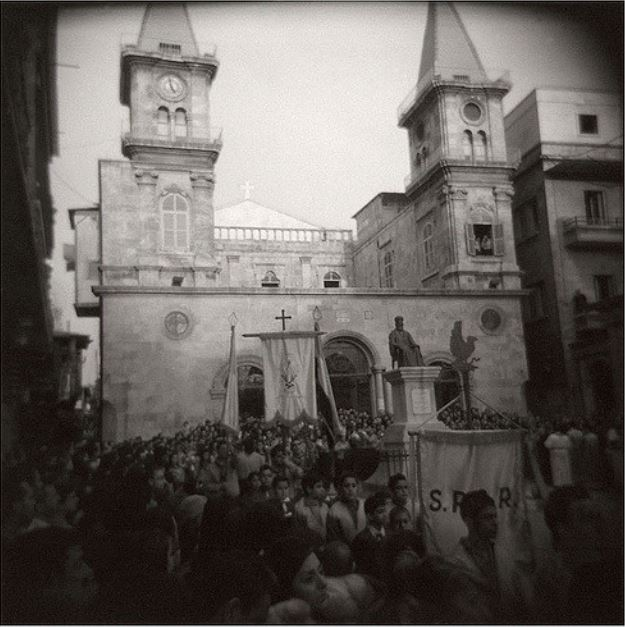
Farhat Square in 2008

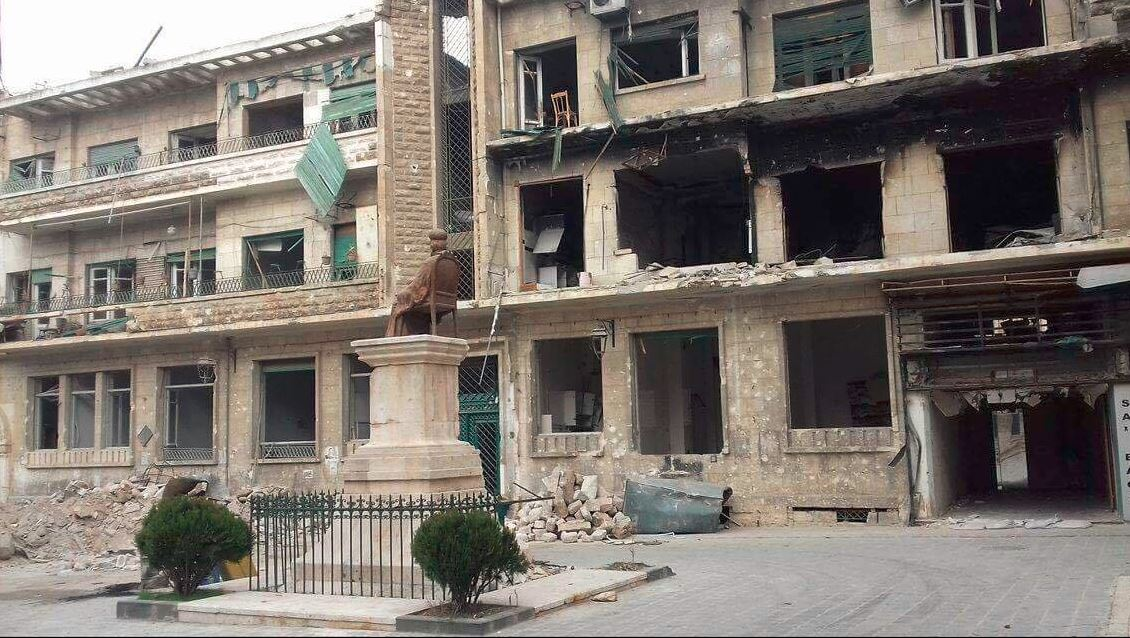
Farhat Square in Aleppo as witnessed in December 2016

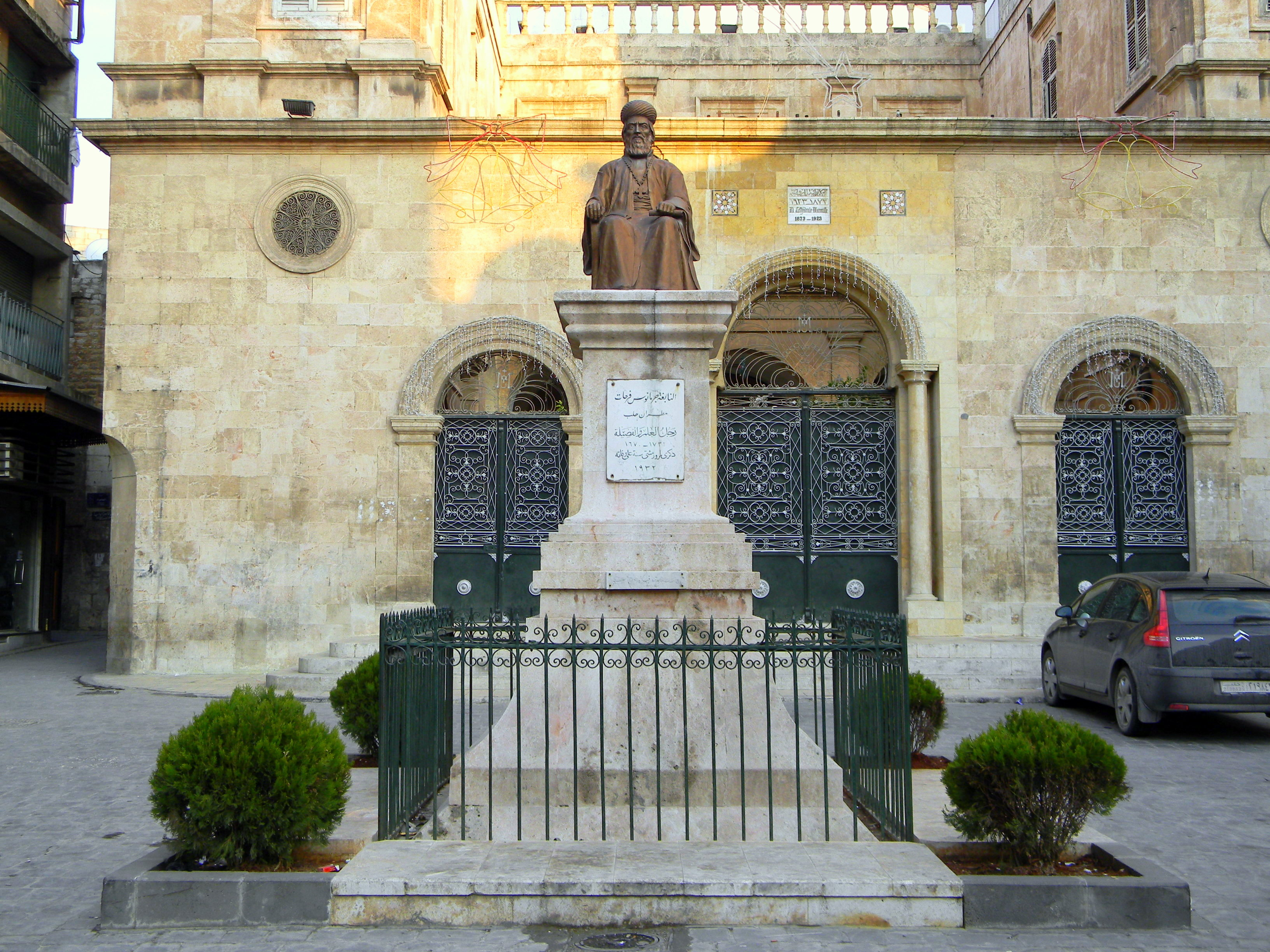
Statue of Germanos Farhat is located on Farhat Square

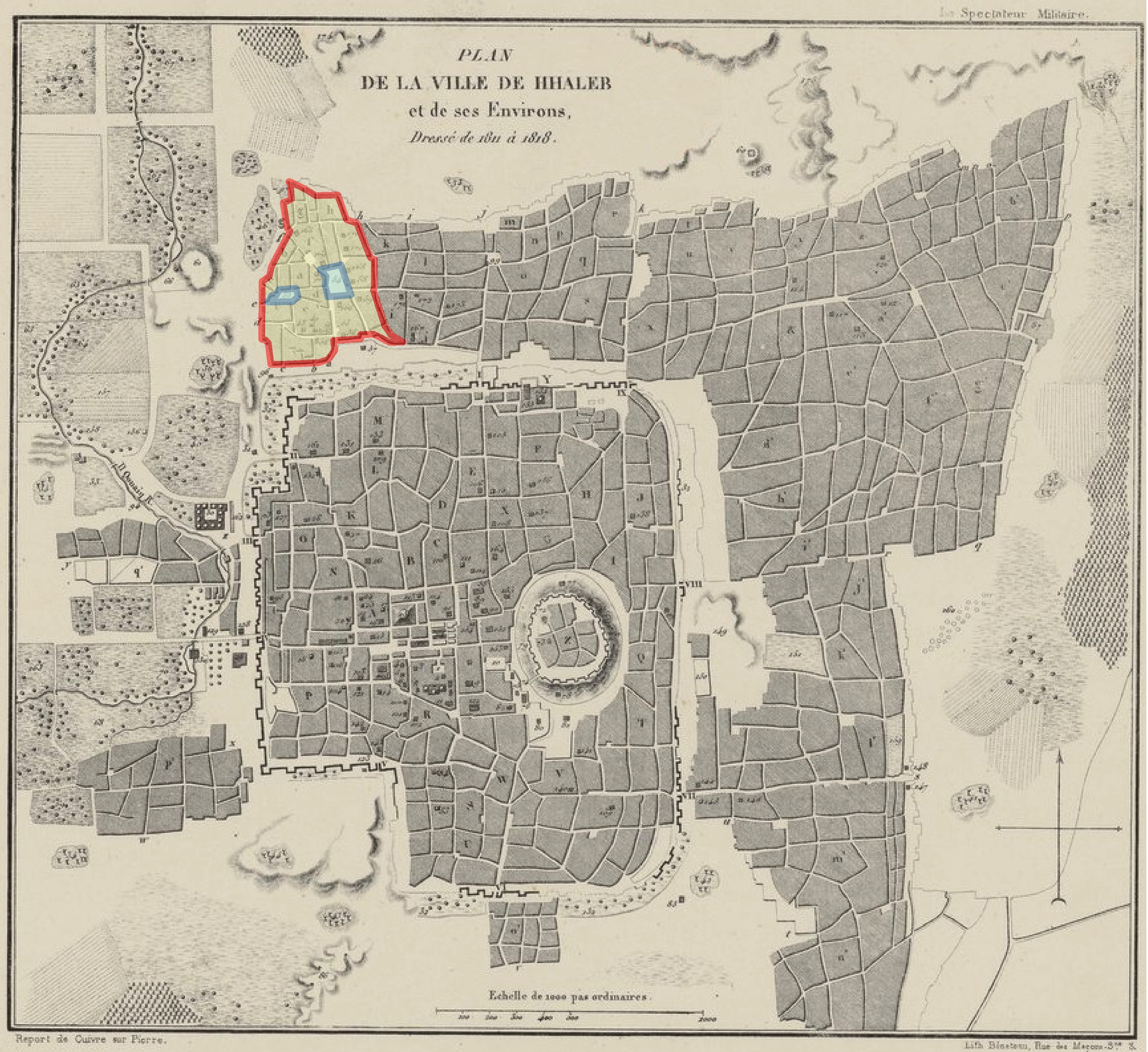
Aleppo 1811 Map w/ Sahat Farhat (west) & Sahat Al Hatab (east) highlighted in blue.

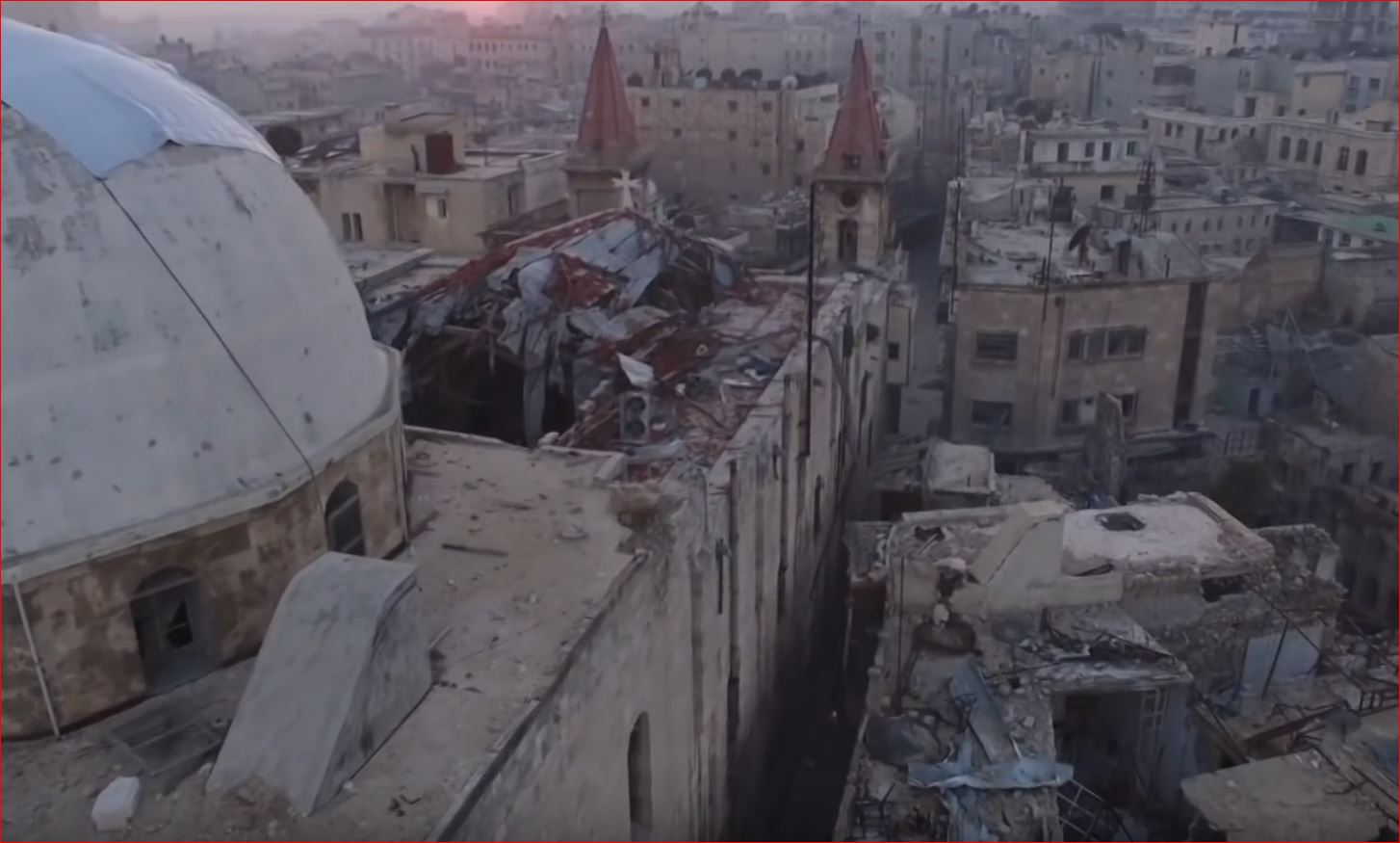
St Elijah Cathedral on Fahat Square was heavily damaged in the Syrian civil war (2016)

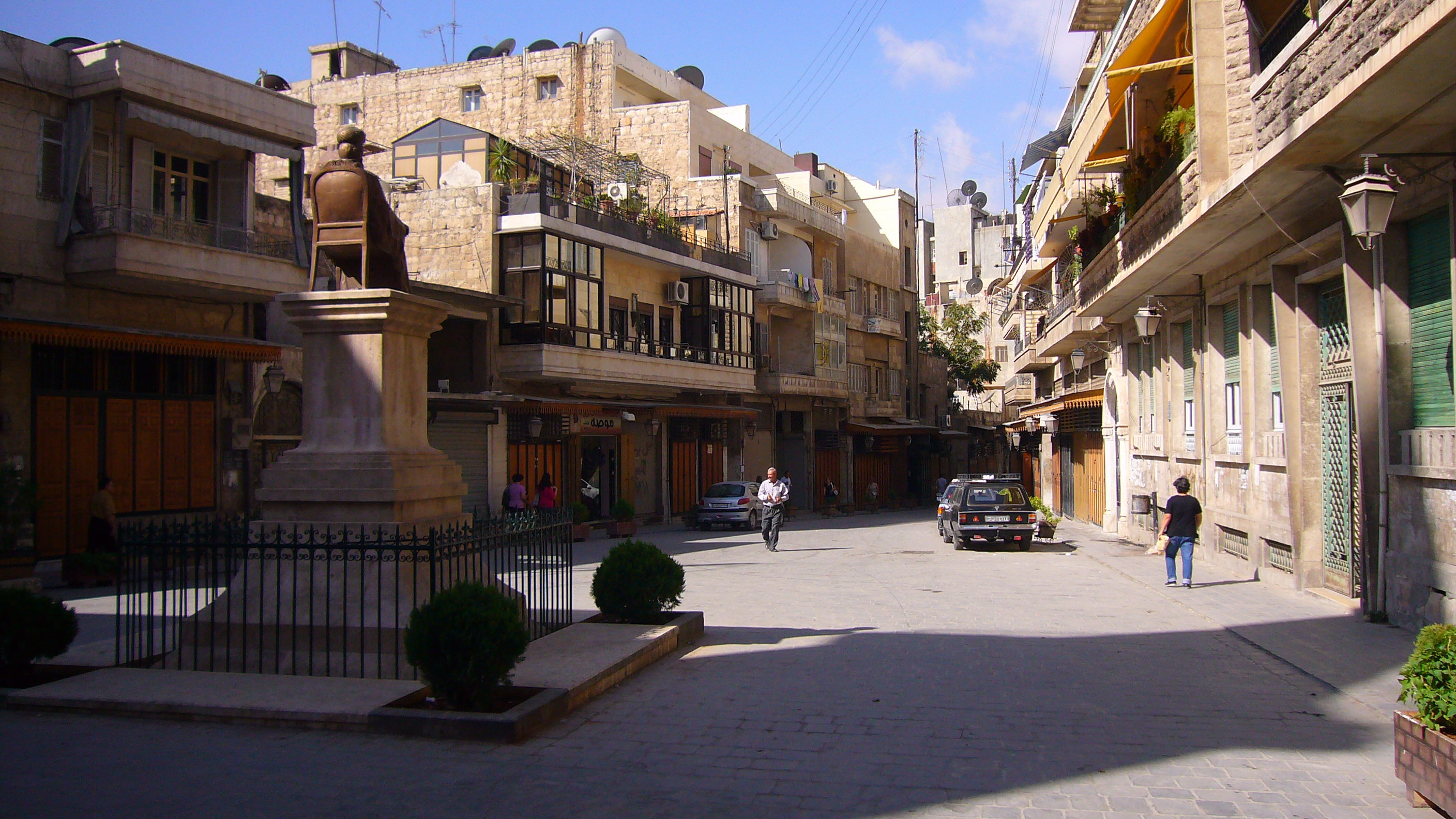
Farhat Square in October 2010

== See also ==
- Ancient City of Aleppo
- Jdeideh (Aleppo)
- Churches of Judayde
- St. Elijah Cathedral, Aleppo
- Forty Martyrs Cathedral
- Church of the Dormition of Our Lady
- Massacre of Aleppo (1850)
