= Cathedral of Saint Elijah, Aleppo =

Maronite cathedral in Aleppo, Syria

Saint Elijah Cathedral
- Saint Elijah Maronite Cathedral

- Location in Aleppo

Religion
- Affiliation: Maronite Church
- Region: Maronite Catholic Archeparchy of Aleppo
- Ecclesiastical or organisational status: Active
- Year consecrated: 1873

Location
- Location: Al-Jdayde quarter, Aleppo, Syria
- Coordinates: 36.2071°N 37.1558°E

Architecture
- Type: Church

Saint Elijah Cathedral (Arabic: كاتدرائية القدّيِس الياس), is a Maronite cathedral in Aleppo, Syria, located in the Christian quarter of al-Jdayde. It is named after the Biblical prophet Elijah. The church was built in 1873, replacing an older Maronite church. It was renovated in 1914.

== History ==
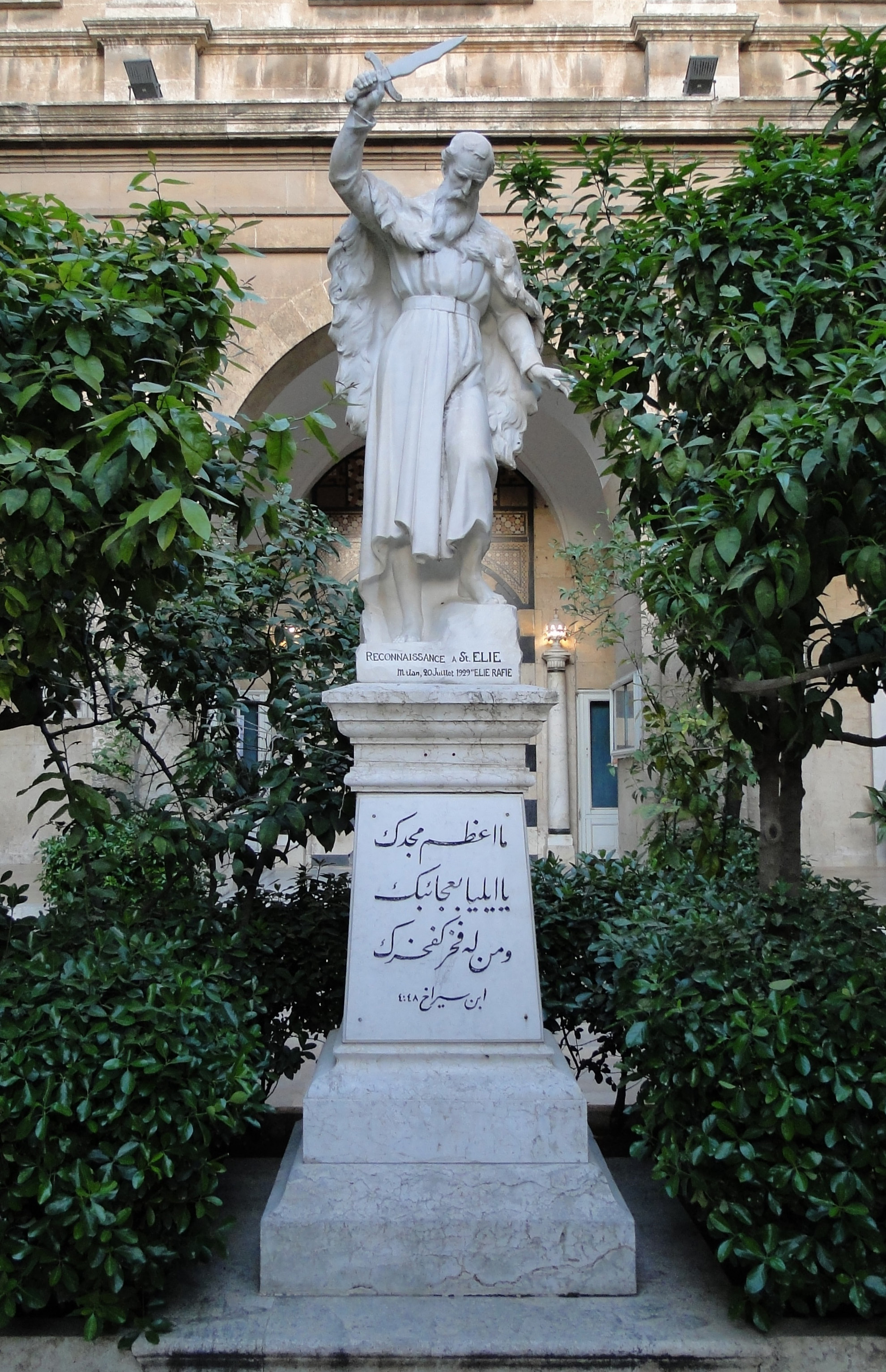
The statue of Saint Elias in the church yard

Prior to the current building of the cathedral, a small church from the 15th century has occupied the same area. The old church was mentioned by the Italian explorer Pietro Della Valle who visited Aleppo in 1625 and described it as one of the four churches that were built adjacent to each other in one yard with one gate, in the newly created Jdeydeh, the Christian quarter. The other three churches are the Forty Martyrs Armenian Church, the Holy Mother of God Armenian Church (the current Zarehian Treasury) and the Greek Orthodox Church of the Dormition of Our Lady.

The new building of the cathedral was completed in 1873. It has two magnificent belfries at its façade, while the marble entrance with yellow columns is situated under the high dome on the eastern side.

In 1914, during the period of Archbishop Michael Akhras, the dome was entirely renovated. For that purpose, concrete was used during the reconstruction process for the first time ever in the construction history of Aleppo, with the assistance of experts from Belgium. During the same period, the chiming clock that plays Ave Maria every fifteen minutes, has been placed on the tower.

In front of the main gate, the statue of Archbishop and poet Germanos Farhat (1670–1732) was erected in 1932 to commemorate the 200th anniversary of his death, and for his efforts in founding the Maronite library of Aleppo, the home of old valuable manuscripts. Since then, the surrounding area of the cathedral was called Farhat square.

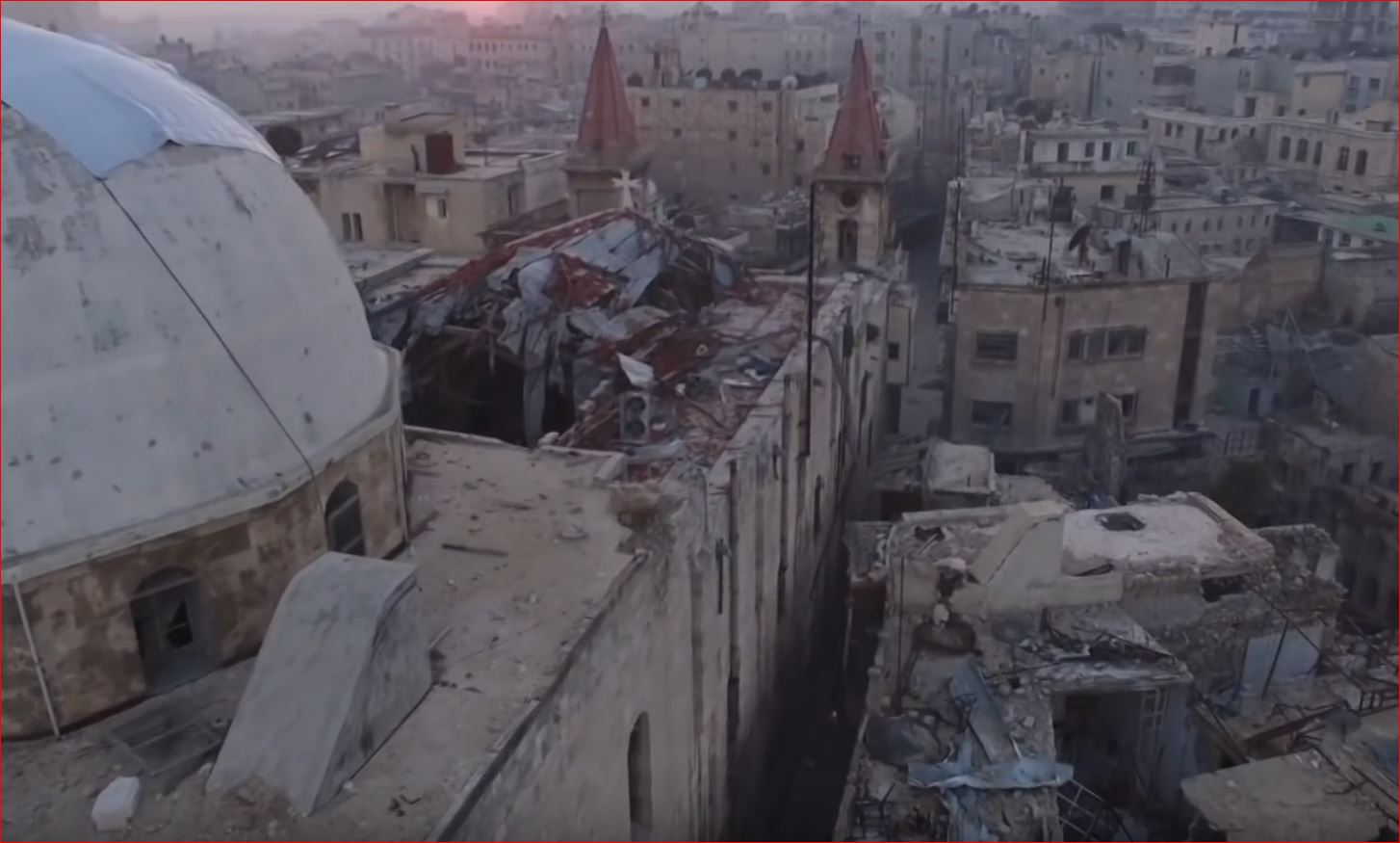
St Elijah Cathedral in December 2016

Saint Elijah Cathedral was heavily damaged during the Syrian civil war with its roof collapsing in 2013 after numerous explosions. The cathedral reopened officially and was re-constructed in July 2020 after a multi year program of restoration and renovation.

== See also ==
- List of churches in Aleppo
