= Beit Achiqbash =

Mansion in Aleppo, Syria

Beit Achiqbash بيت أجقباش في الجديدة
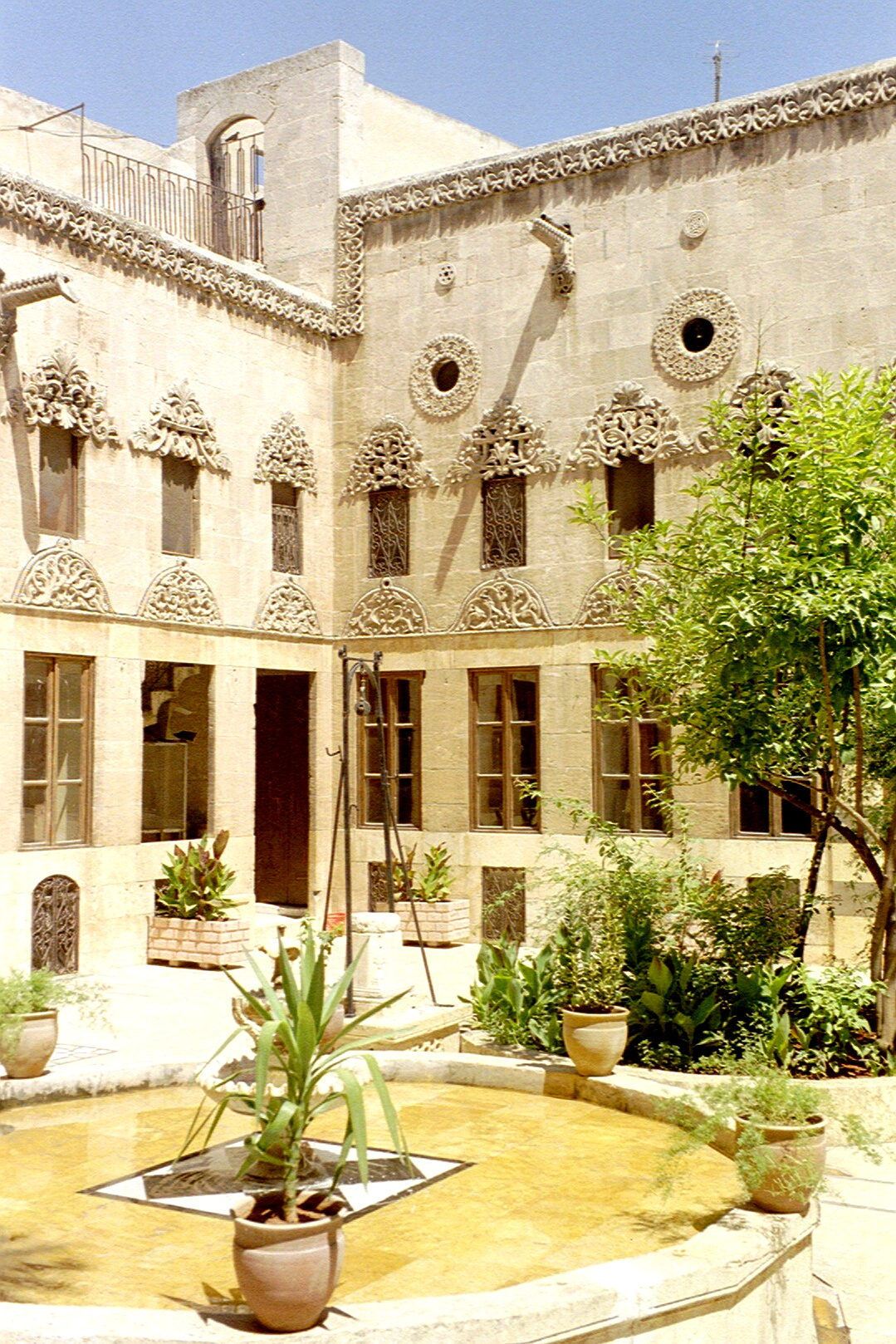
- Achikbache House and Courtyard in Aleppo, 2001

- Location within Aleppo
- 36°12′21.79″N 37°09′23.69″E
- Location: Al-Jdayde, Aleppo, Syria

History
- Built: 1757

Site notes
- Architectural style: Ottoman
- Governing body: Directorate-General of Antiquities and Museums
- Owner: Government of Syria

Beit Achiqbash (Arabic: بيت أجقباش في الجديدة; Bait Achikbache House, Bayt Ajiqbash, Maison Ajikbash) is an old Aleppine courtyard mansion built in the mid 18th Century by Qarah Ali (Karaly), a wealthy Christian merchant.

== Background ==
Beit Achiqbash is one of a number of historic buildings found in the Al-Jdayde Christian quarter of Aleppo. It was built in 1757 CE. A Turk named Ashiqbash later bought the house after the Karaly (Qara Ali) moved to Alexandretta.

The house is famous for its courtyard, which is extravagantly decorated in a Mamluk-Rococo style. The building was turned into a museum in 1973 and restored in the 1980s. It is well known for the fine carved ornaments that decorate its courtyard. Its style is said to have been greatly influenced by Baroque decorative traditions. The rooms on its eastern side were eliminated to make way for the street that now runs in front of the property.

Beit Achiqbash remains the home of the Popular Traditions Museum with its collection of fine decorations of Aleppine art along with artefacts of past local lives.

== Recent Developments ==
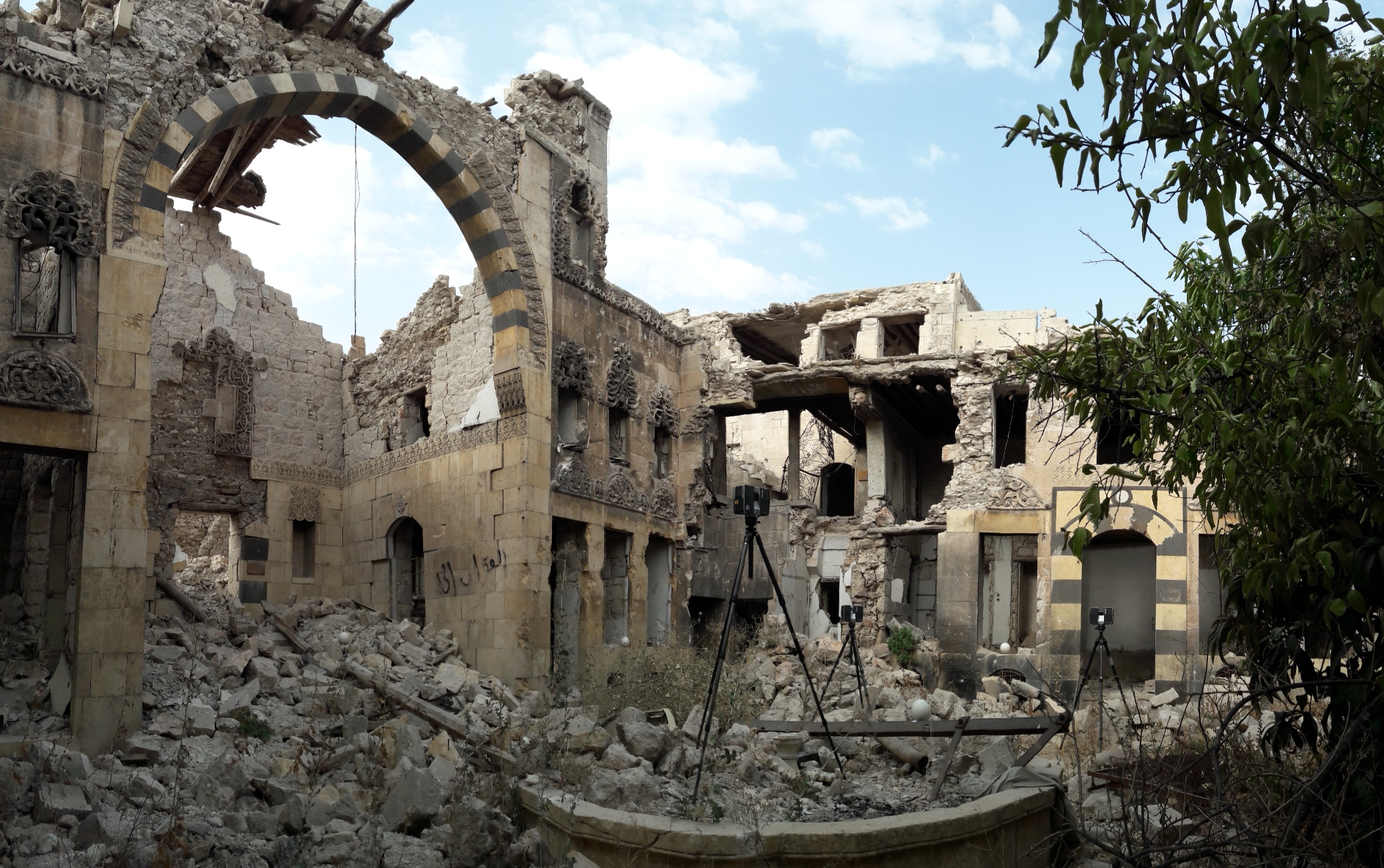
Aleppo's Beit Achiqbash in 2017

The building, like much of Aleppo's old city, suffered "severe" damage and looting caused by street fighting during Syria's civil war.

A survey of Beit Achiqbash was completed in November 2017 by the Directorate-General of Antiquities and Museums and UNESCO to facilitate emergency consolidation of its structure.

Consolidation work on the structure began in 2019. As of August 23, 2021, restoration and construction work took place in the courtyard, including sculptural work, restoration of facades using original elements such as old chasuble stones. The second phase of the restoration was completed on September 2, 2021. The main architect of the entire reconstruction is Eng. Pierre Ghassan Zarz.

== Gallery ==
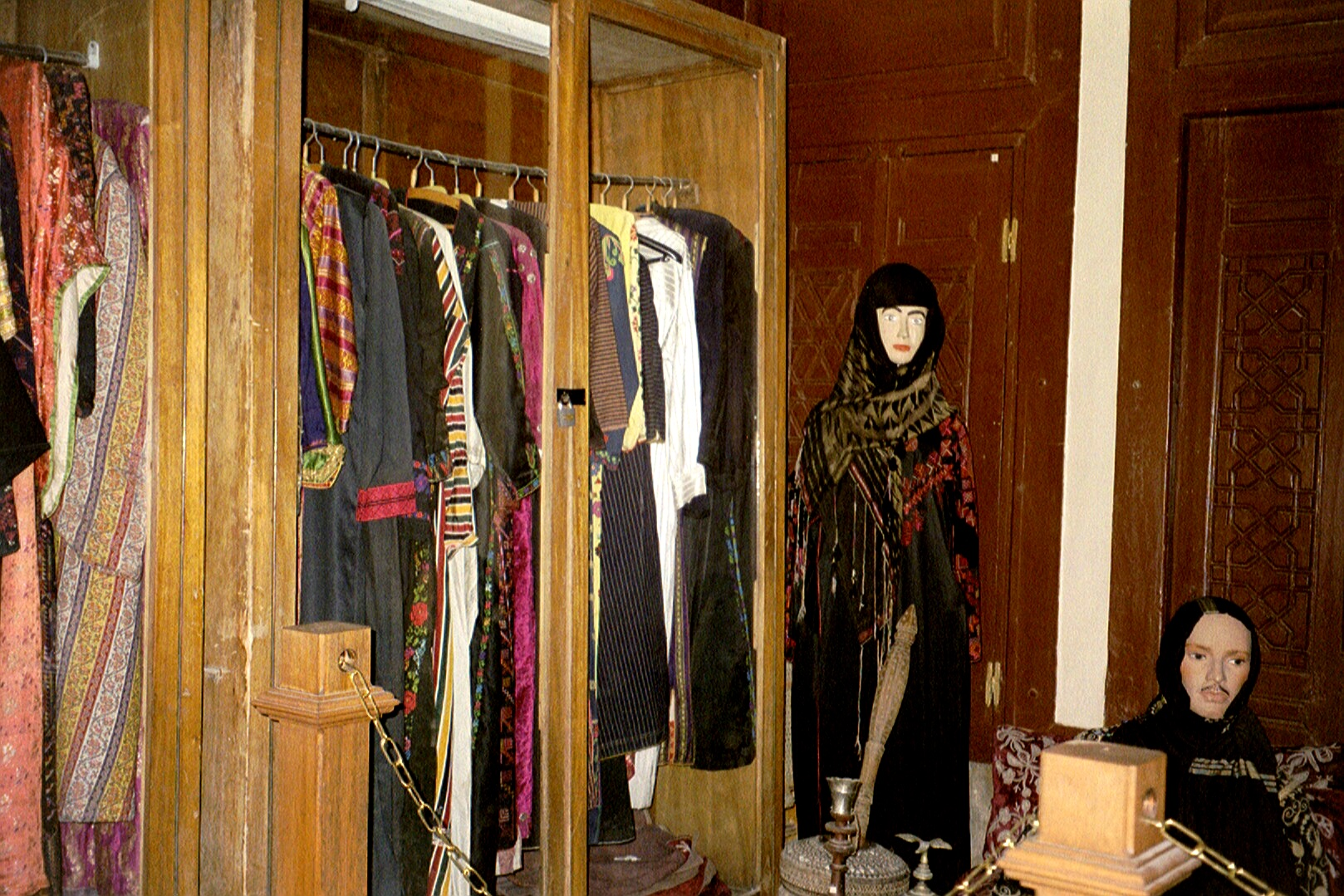
Interior of Beit Ajikbash (2001)

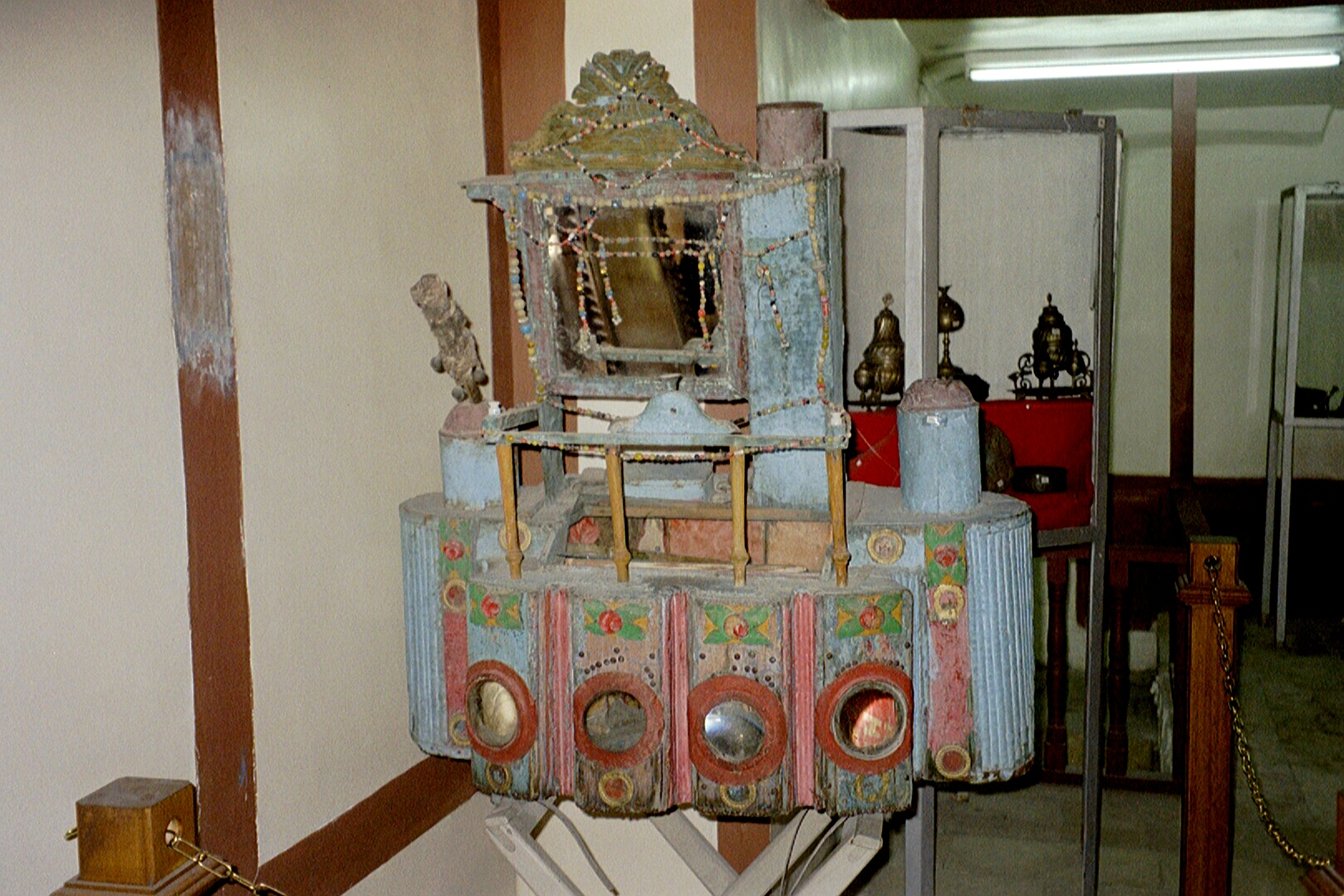
Interior of Beit Ajikbash (2001)

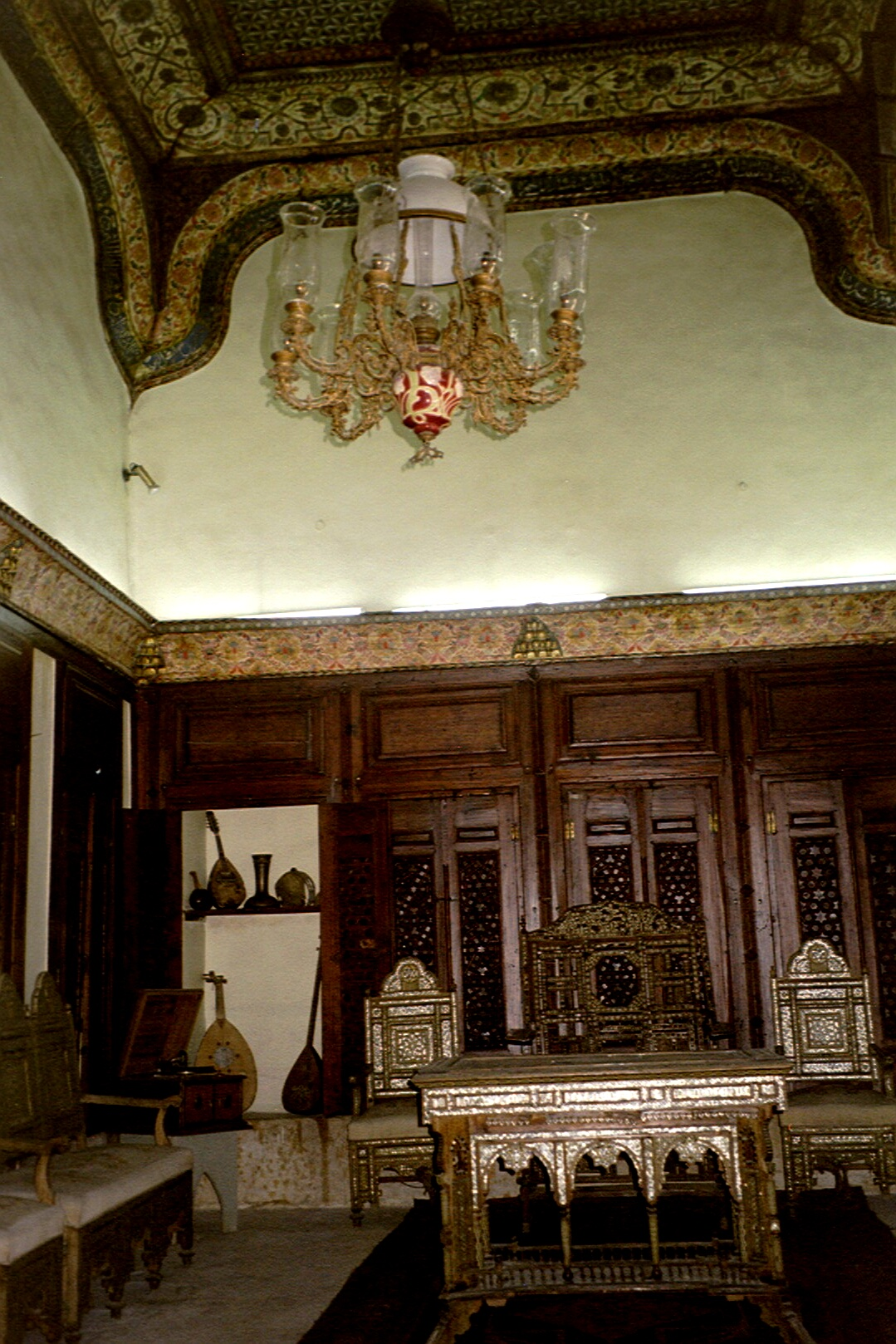
Interior of Beit Ajikbash (2001)

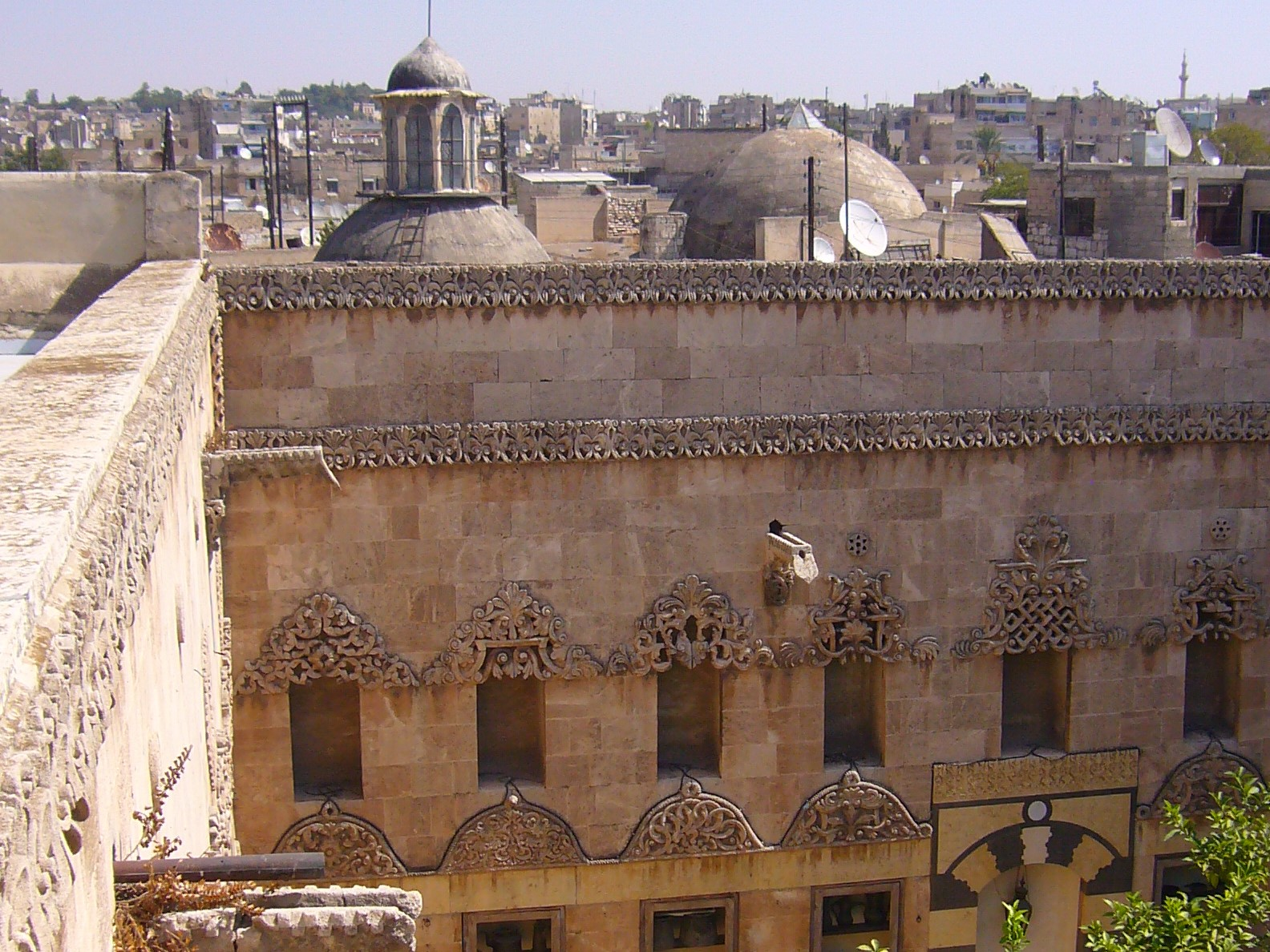
Beit Ajikbash Museum of Aleppo (2010)

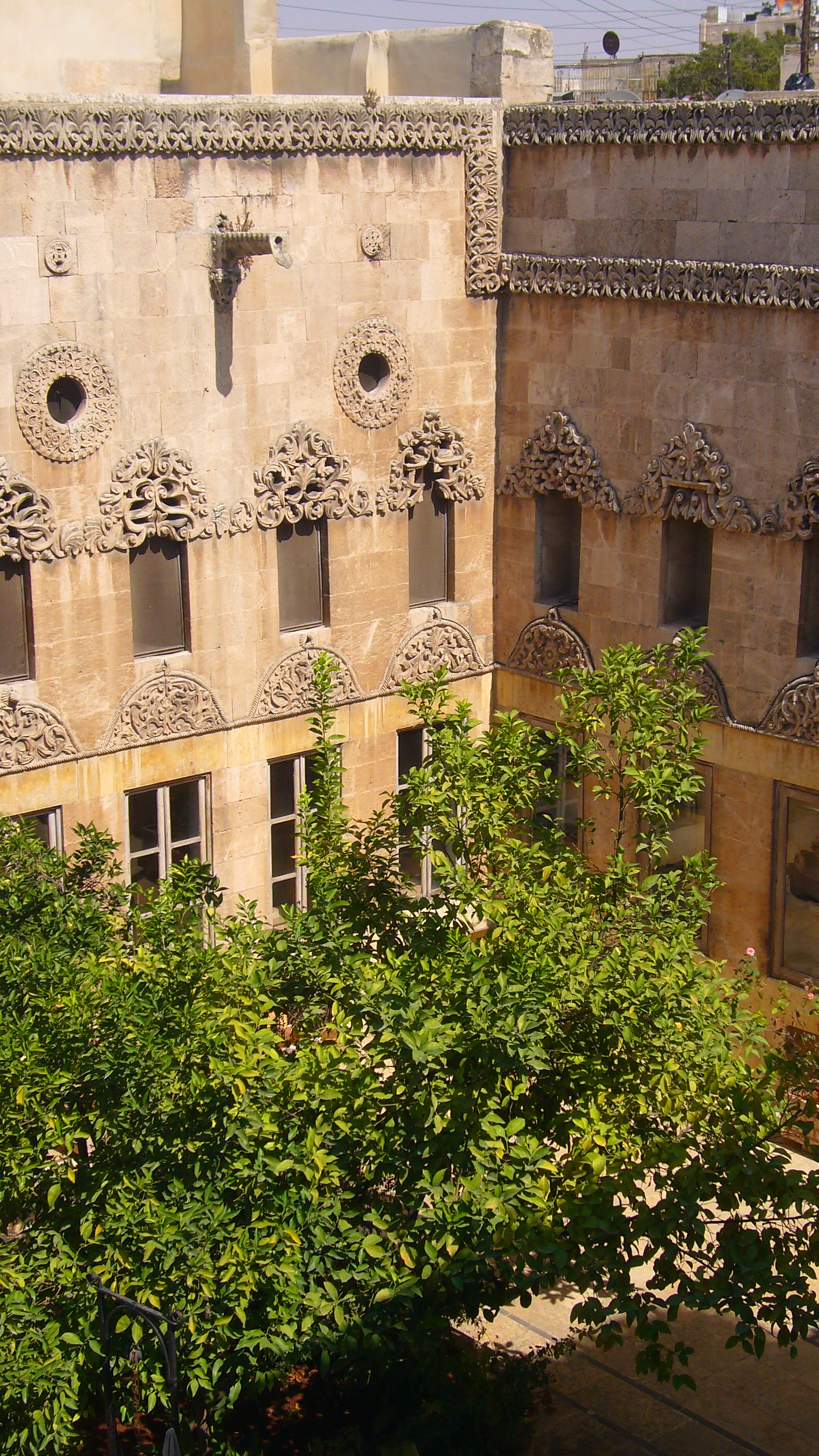
Beit Ajikbash Courtyard (2010)

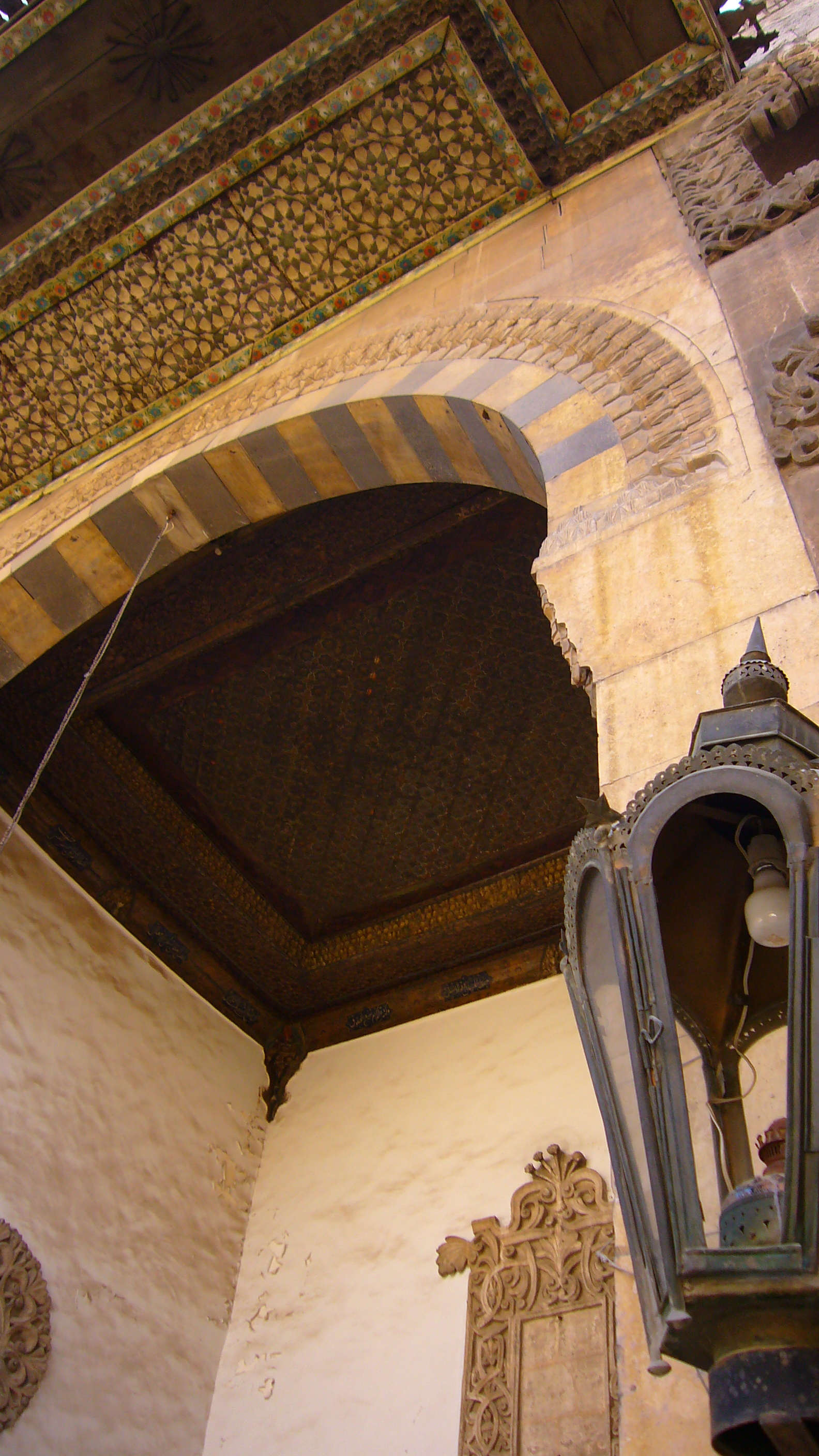
Beit Ajikbash Iwan (2010)

File:Beit Ajikbash survey (2016)

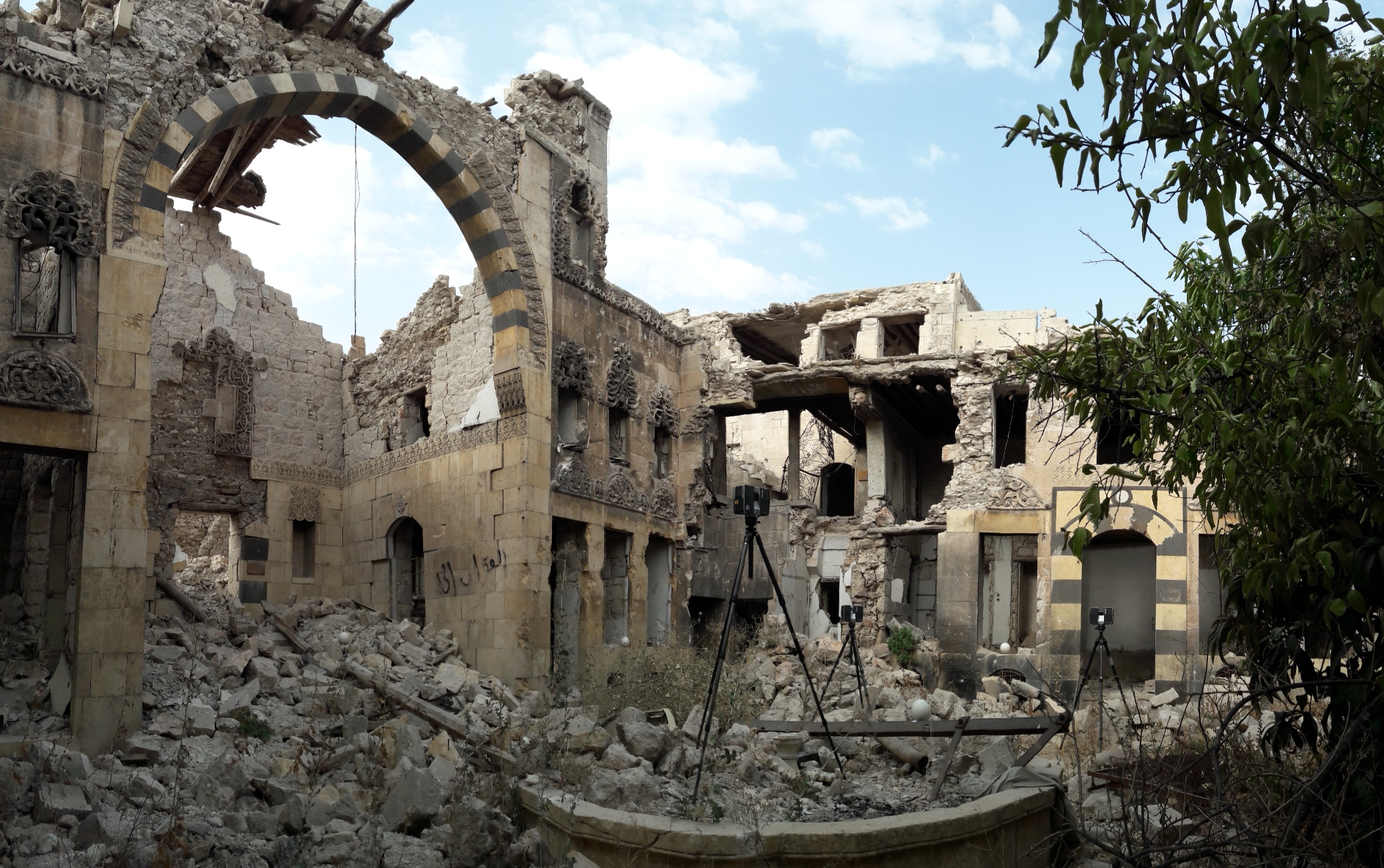
Beit Ajikbash photograph taken during damage survey (2017)

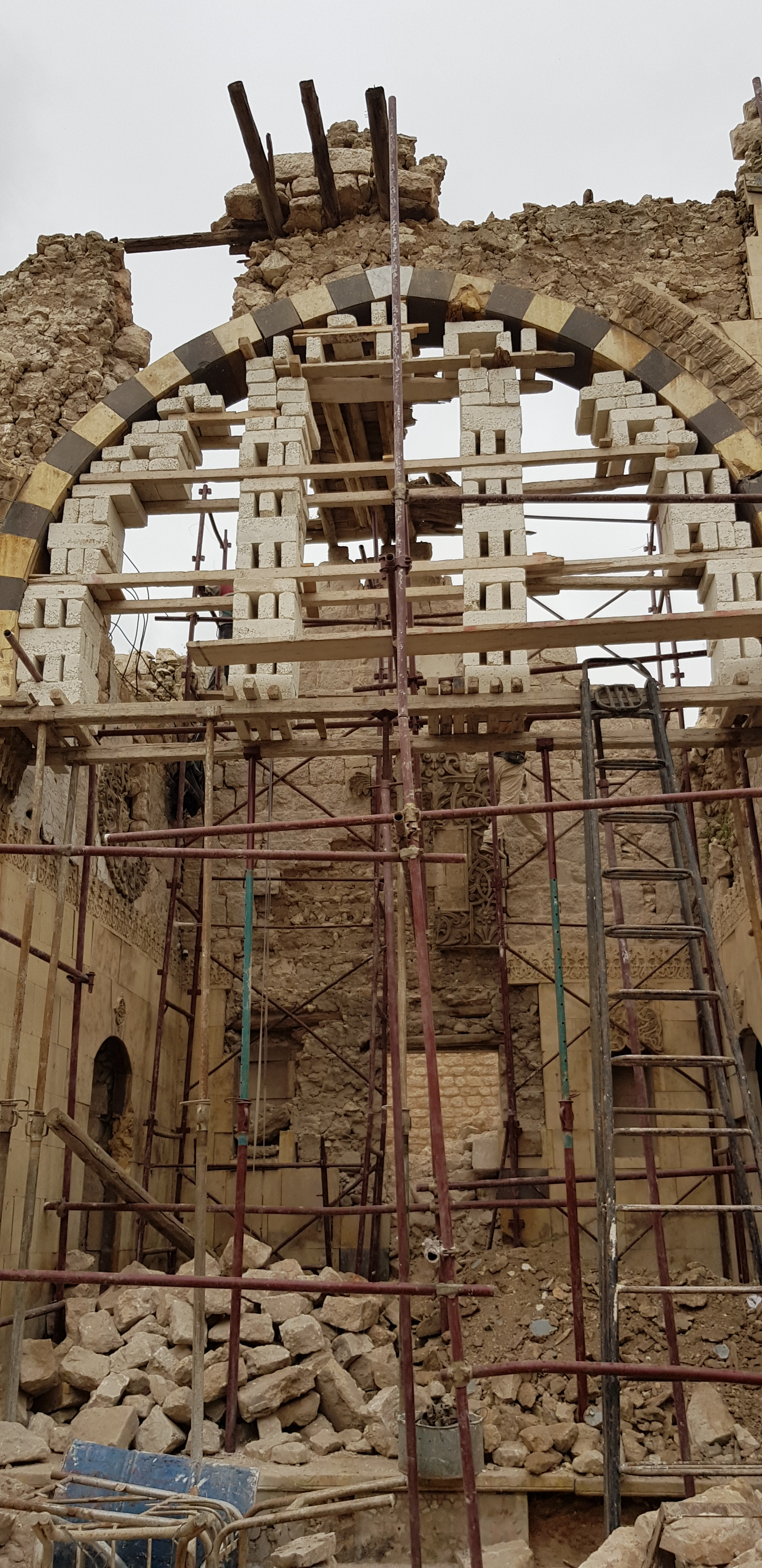
Beit Ajikbash photograph taken during consolidation work (2019)

== See also ==
- List of museums in Syria
- Ancient City of Aleppo
- Jdeideh (Aleppo)
- Beit Ghazaleh
