= Church of the Dormition of Our Lady =

Greek Orthodox church in Aleppo, Syria

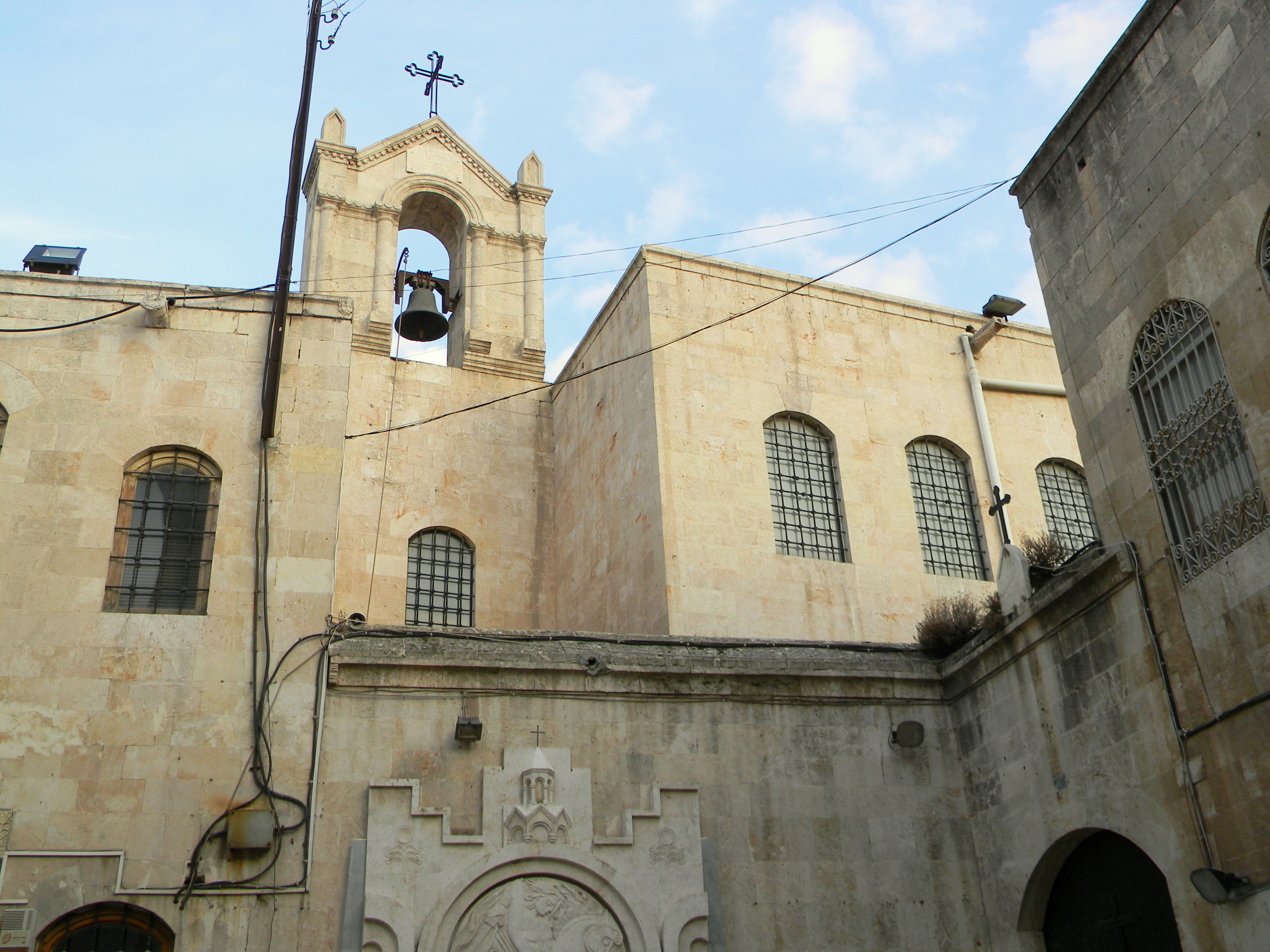
- Church of the Dormition of Our Lady

- Location in Aleppo

Religion
- Affiliation: Greek Orthodox Church
- Region: Aleppo
- Rite: Orthodox
- Ecclesiastical or organisational status: Active

Location
- Location: Al-Jdayde quarter, Aleppo, Syria
- Coordinates: 36.206035°N 37.155768°E

Architecture
- Type: Church
- Completed: 15th century

Specifications
- Dome: 1
- Materials: stone

Church of the Dormition of Our Lady (Arabic: كنيسة رقاد السيدة العذراء) is a Greek Orthodox church in Jdeydeh quarter of Aleppo, Syria. The church belongs the Greek Orthodox Prelacy, the Diocese of Aleppo. It was built during the first half of the 15th century and is active up to now.

== History ==
The church was mentioned in an Armenian manuscript written by Movses Vardapet as one of three churches that were enlarged and renovated in 1499–1500 by the donation of an Armenian elite named Reyis Baron Yesayi. The two others being the Forty Martyrs Armenian Cathedral and the old Saint Elias Maronite Church.

The Italian explorer Pietro Della Valle who visited Aleppo in 1625, has mentioned the church as the Church of Saint Georges, being one of the four churches that were built adjacent to each other in one yard with one gate, in the newly created Jdeydeh Christian quarter. The other three churches are the Forty Martyrs Armenian Church, the Holy Mother of God Armenian Church (the current Zarehian Treasury) and the old Maronite Church of Saint Elias.

The cathedral was damaged during the 1822 earthquake of Aleppo. It was renovated between 1850 and 1852, after the Aleppo massacre of 1850 (Arabic: قومة حلب), when the Christians of Aleppo were massacred and the quarter of Jdeydeh was entirely destroyed by the Muslim population of the city. The cathedral is home to many valuable icons of the famous Aleppine school.

== Current status ==
By January 2020, the church was undergoing a comprehensive restoration as it was badly damaged by militants through the Battle of Aleppo in 2015.

== Gallery ==
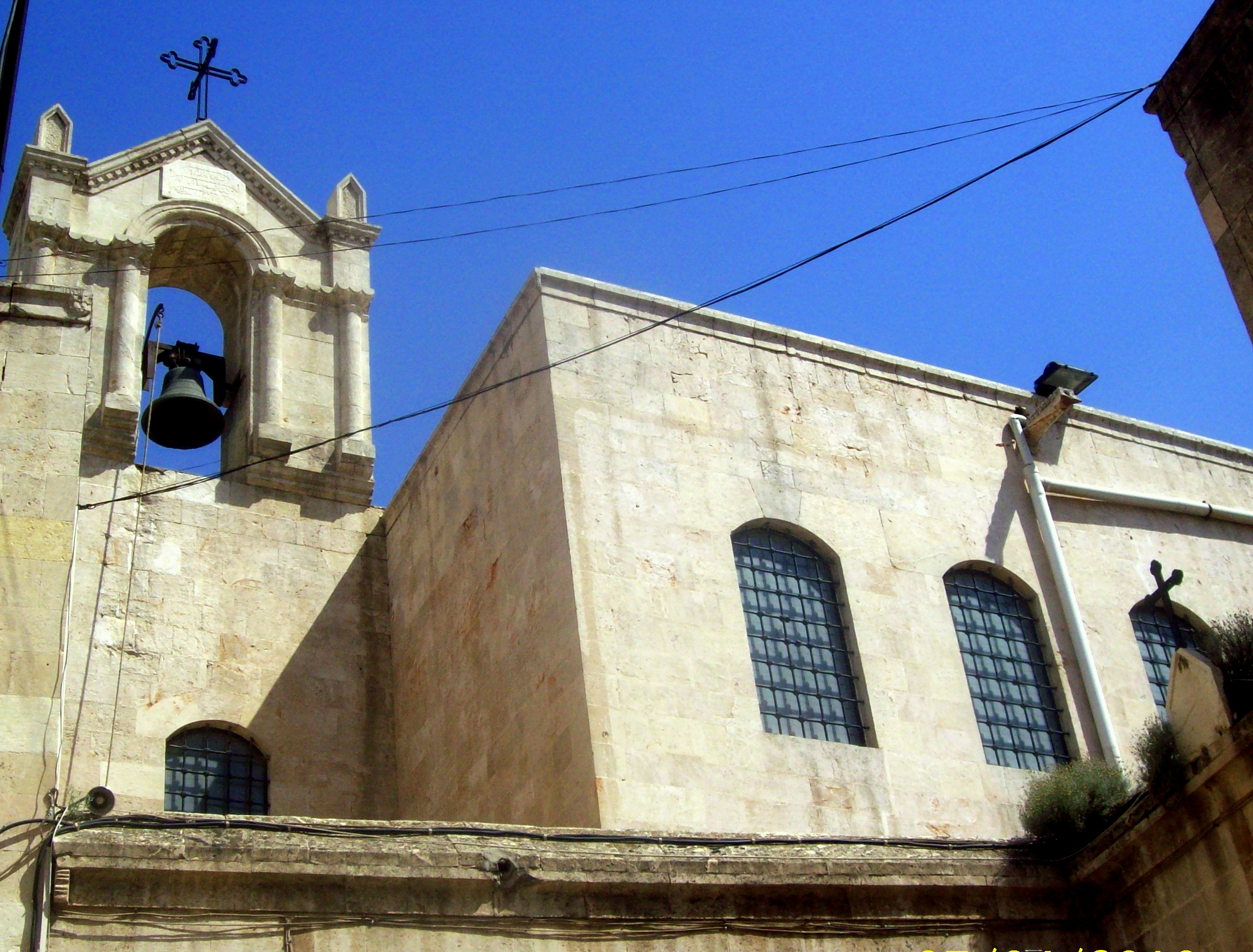

== See also ==
- List of churches in Aleppo
