= Al-Jdayde =

Al-Jdayde (Aleppo)
- جديدة (Arabic)
- Al-Jdeideh, Al-Judayda
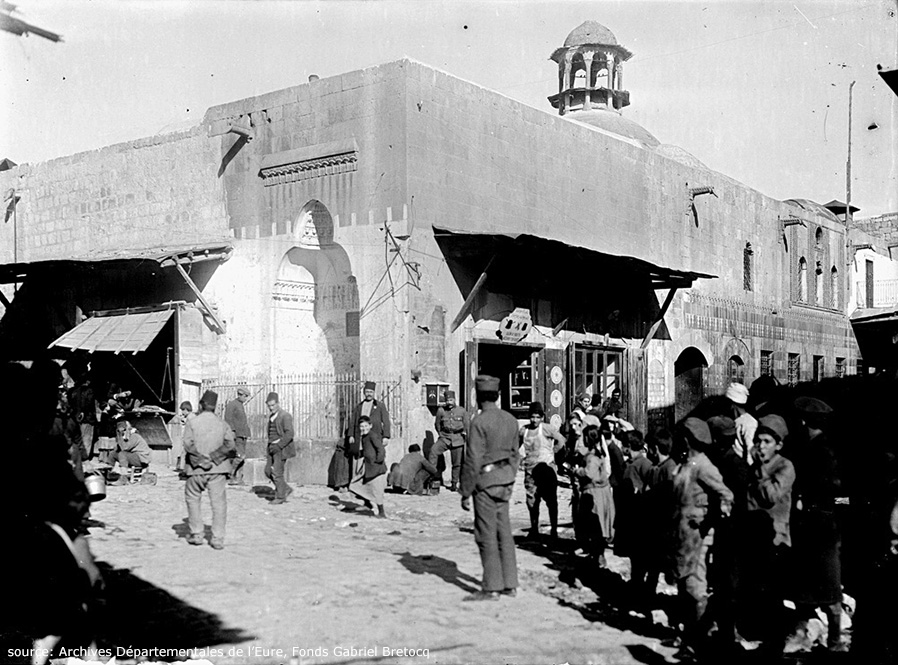
- Al-Jdayde, district of Aleppo as seen in 1920

- Location within Aleppo
- 36°12′25.0″N 37°09′24.4″E
- Location: Aleppo, Syria

History
- Built: Late 14th Century

Al-Jdayde (Arabic: جديدة "The New Town", also transcribed as al-Jdeideh, al-Judayda, al-Jdeïdé, al-Jadida or al-Jdeydeh) is a historic predominantly Christian neighbourhood of Aleppo. Noted for its winding narrow alleys, richly decorated mansions and churches—it is an area of significant cultural and historical interest. Much of Al-Jdayde suffered catastrophic damage during the Syrian Civil War.

== History ==
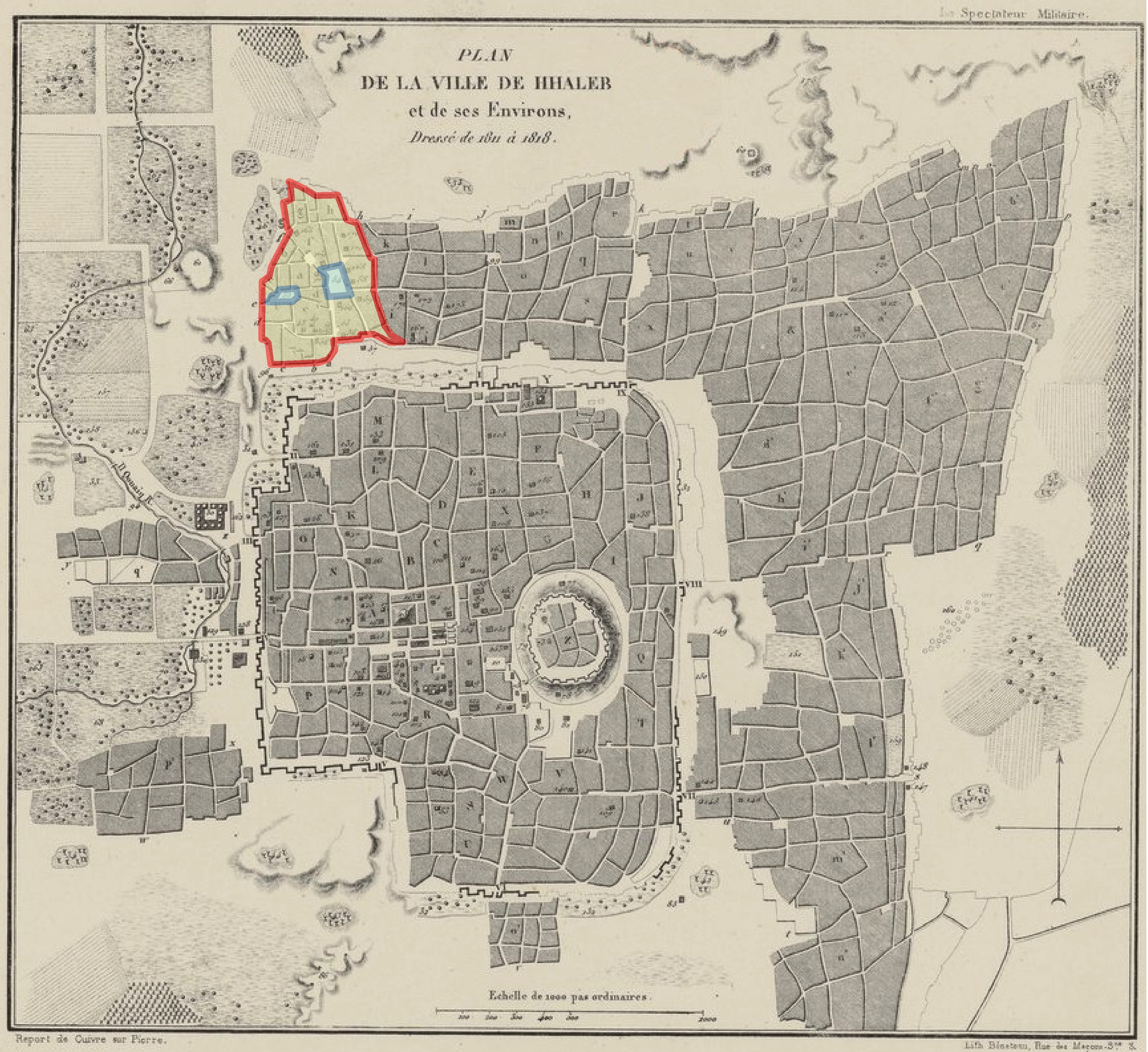
Al-Jdayde shown in red as established outside walls of the ancient city, 1820s

At the end of the Mamluk period, al-Jdayde was a small suburb benefiting from a few shops located outside of city's northern walls and near the cemeteries and storage areas. The development of the city along the roads connecting the Bab al-Nasr gate with neighbouring villages to the North and northeast progressively integrated Jdayde into the city of Aleppo.

By the late 14th century, these quarters were equipped with khutba mosques and fountains made possible by a network of water works. A new water duct, opened in 1490–91, facilitated the further extension of the Jdayde neighbourhood and the creation of its hammams. Christian cemeteries and probably also the remains of ancient churches of the Byzantine period are to be found in the West side of the al-Jdayde suburb. The earlier settlement of Salibeh in this ancient Christian sector, followed by the development of Jdayde, reflects the growth of the Christian population and its desire to reside together in specific areas.

Most churches, newly built or enlarged, are found around Farhat Square next to the Salibeh intersection, notably, the Armenian Holy Forty Martyrs Church which was enlarged in 1490, the Greek Orthodox, the Maronite and the Syriac churches. The neighbourhood was gradually settled by notables as well as less affluent residents.

== Character ==
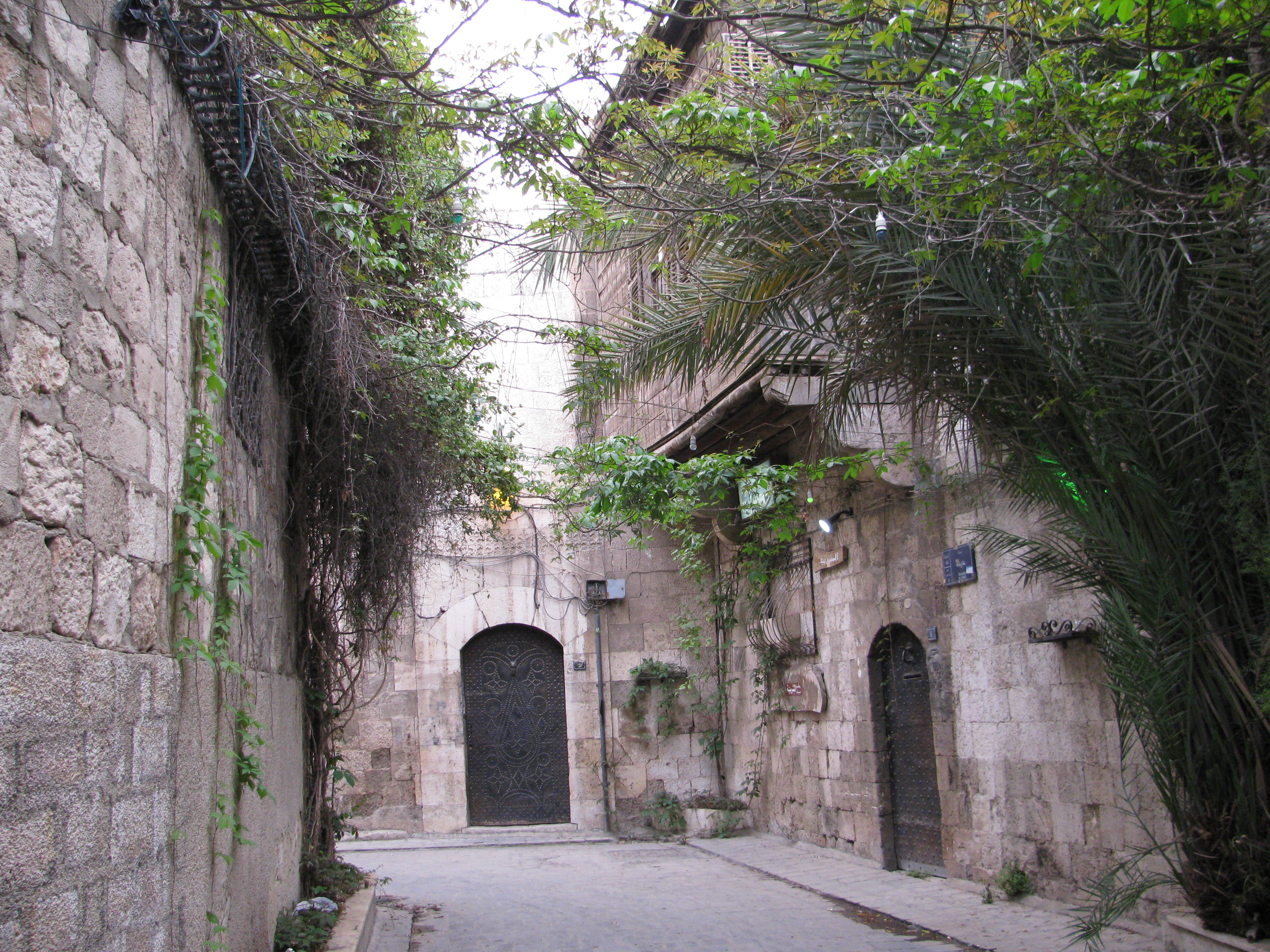
A characteristic 16th-century narrow alleyway of Al-Jdayde

The Armenians, who specialized in trade with Persia and India, were the predominant inhabitants of Jdeideh. During the 16th and 17th centuries, following the Ottoman conquest, the neighbourhood was subdivided into rectangular land parcels. Two large Muslim waqfs (religious trusts), founded in 1583–90 and in 1653, have been in the heart of the area for centuries.

These two architectural ensembles, with richly decorated facades and regular layout, hosted the majority of the commercial and social services for the neighbourhood, where Muslim and Christian, rich and poor, lived side by side. They included a fountain in front of the Christian quarter, a café, a large hammam, a small mosque and a school for Muslim pupils, a cloth market, four large textile workshops, a vast cereal warehouse, and various souks for food and local services.

Here numbers of locals and dragomen would, with the encouragement of various sultans, assist foreign merchants conduct their trade in Aleppo.

== Revitalisation ==
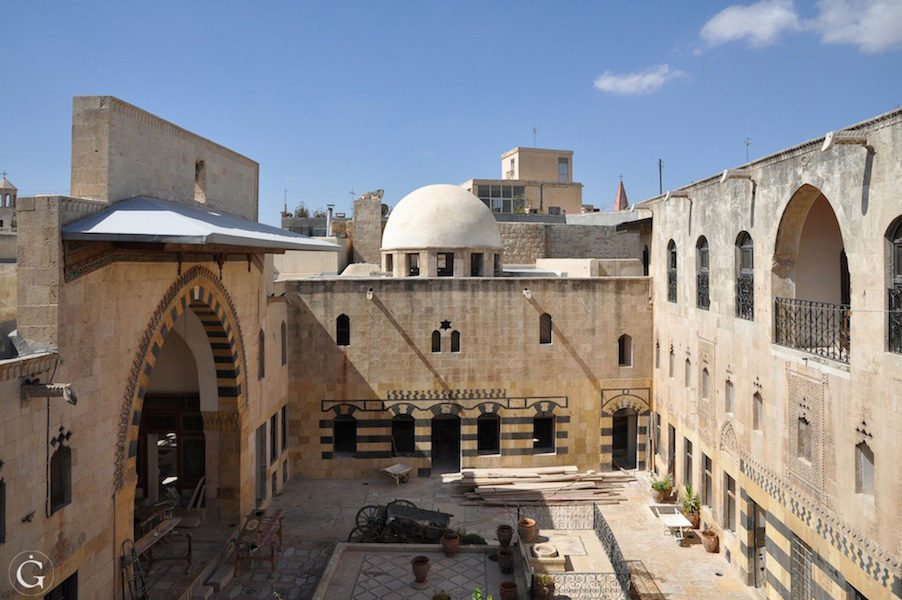
Beit Ghazaleh; an example of renovation in al-Jdayde

In 1990–2000, al-Jdayde—noted for its winding narrow alleys, richly decorated mansions and churches—became an area of significant cultural, historical and tourist interest for national and international visitors. An ever-present scent of flowers, especially Jasmin, was said to permeate the area.

Many of the neighbourhood's historic palaces were revitalised as museums, boutique hotels and restaurants. Some of the most important historic buildings of the al-Jdayde quarter include: Beit Wakil, Beit Ghazaleh, Dar Zamaria, Beit Achiqbash, Beit Sader, Beit Sissi, Dar Basile and Beit Dallal.

Jdayde's two squares, Sahat Farhat and Sahat Al Hatab were also renovated during this period.

== Recent developments ==
Al-Jdayde suffered major damage resulting from rebel underground tunnel bombing in April 2015

Much of al-Jdayde suffered catastrophic damage during the Syrian civil war which began in Aleppo in 2012. The area found itself on the front line of a four-year war of attrition between combatants.

In particular, a series of huge underground explosions conducted by the armed opposition under Sahat Al Hatab in April 2015 devastated the neighbourhood. A number of monuments, museums, churches including Beit Ghazaleh, Beit Achiqbash and the Waqf of Ibshir Mustafa Pasha, were heavily damaged by fighting. Furthermore, numerous buildings were stripped of their fixtures and fittings and ancient decorations looted.

A collaborative high precision survey of various monuments in the zone were completed in November 2017 by the DGAM and UNESCO to facilitate their protection and emergency consolidation. The process of the rehabilitation of Sahat al Hatab square, which began with back-filling of craters in 2017, continued with rubble clearance in 2018. Reconstruction on a number of key elements in the neighbourhood have since begun. The situation regarding the return of trees to the square is unclear.

== Gallery ==
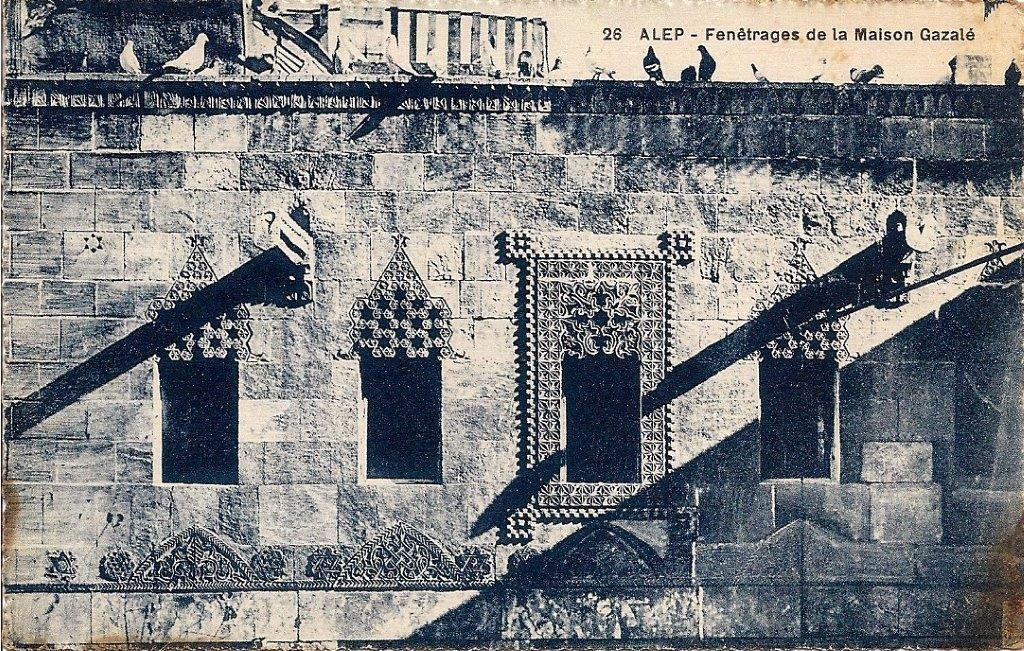
Windows of Dar Zamariya in al-Jdayde (postcard 1918–22)

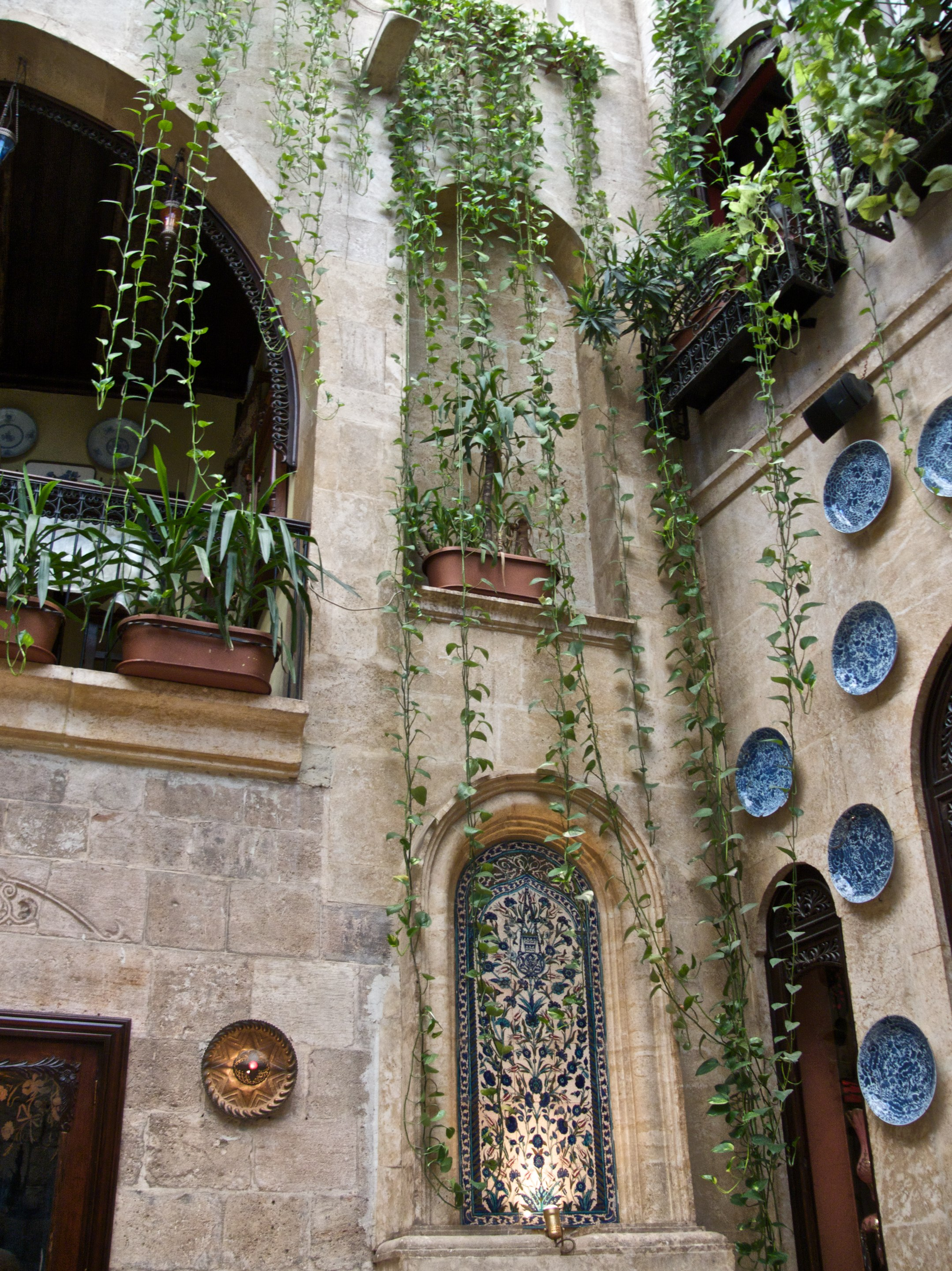
Beit Sissi, a mansion renovated as piano bar

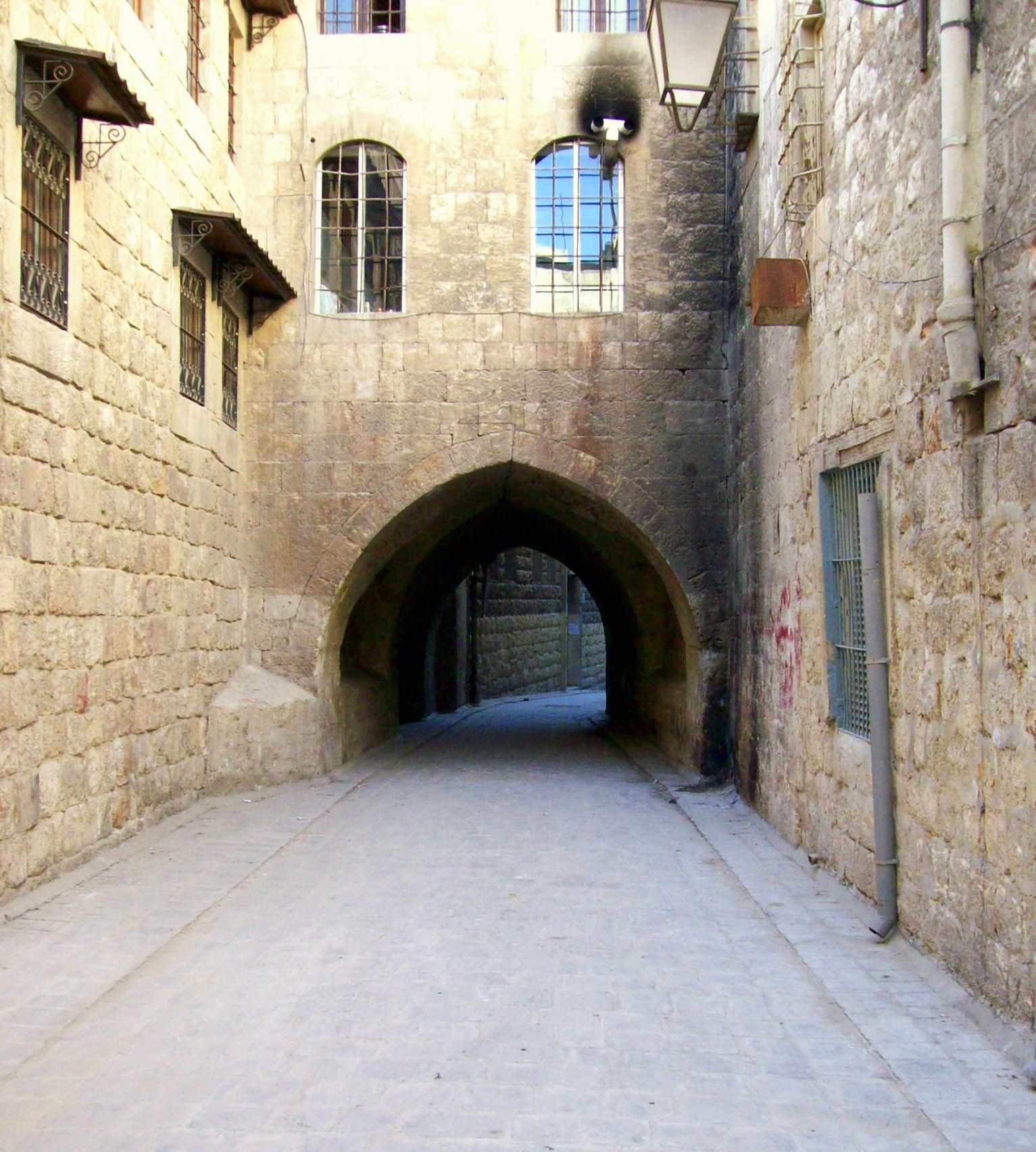
The Hokedun alley at the Armenian quarter of al-Jdayde

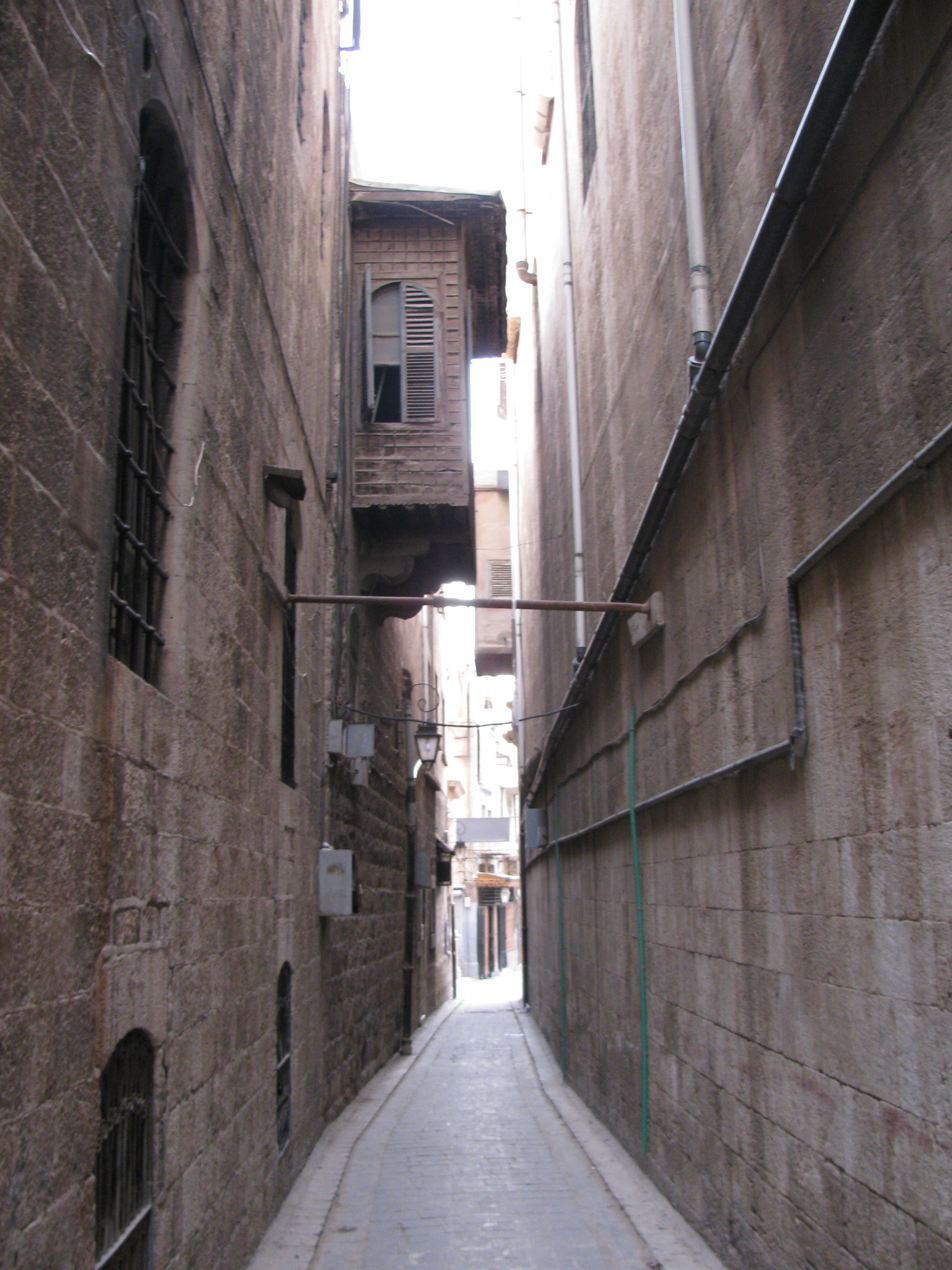
A narrow alley towards the Farhat Square

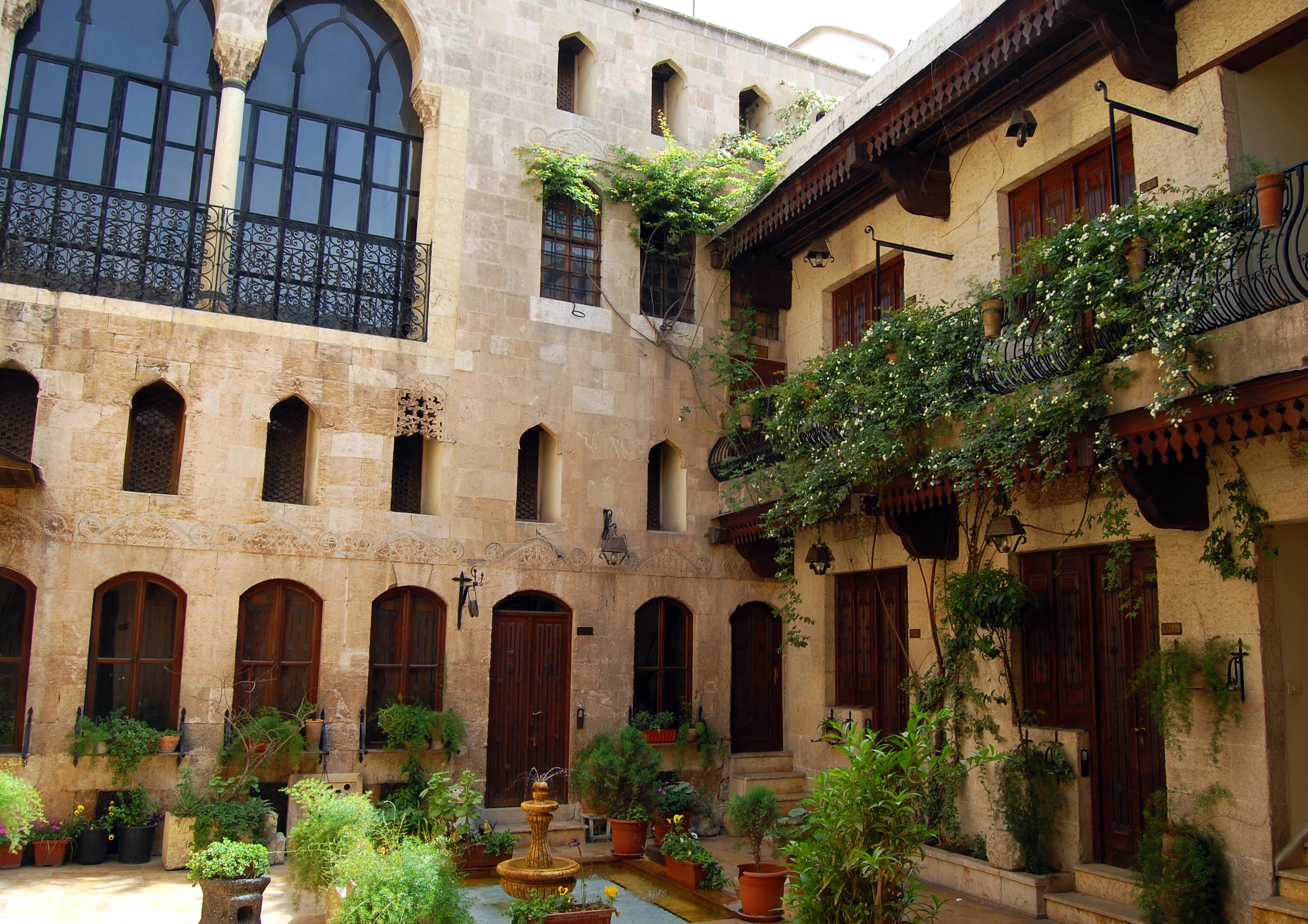
Beit Wakil, a mansion renovated and converted into a boutique hotel

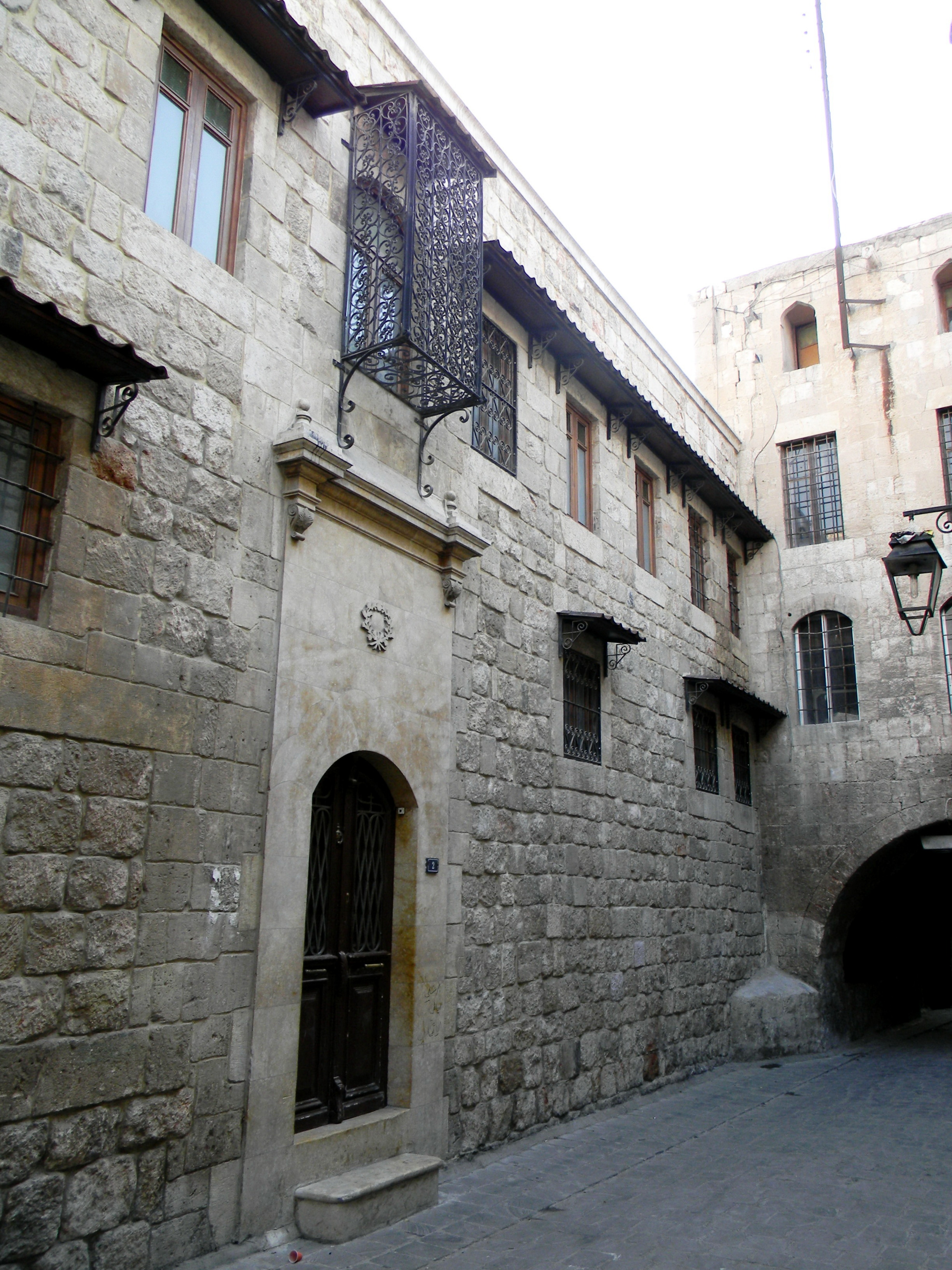
An Armenian school at the old quarter of al-Jdayde

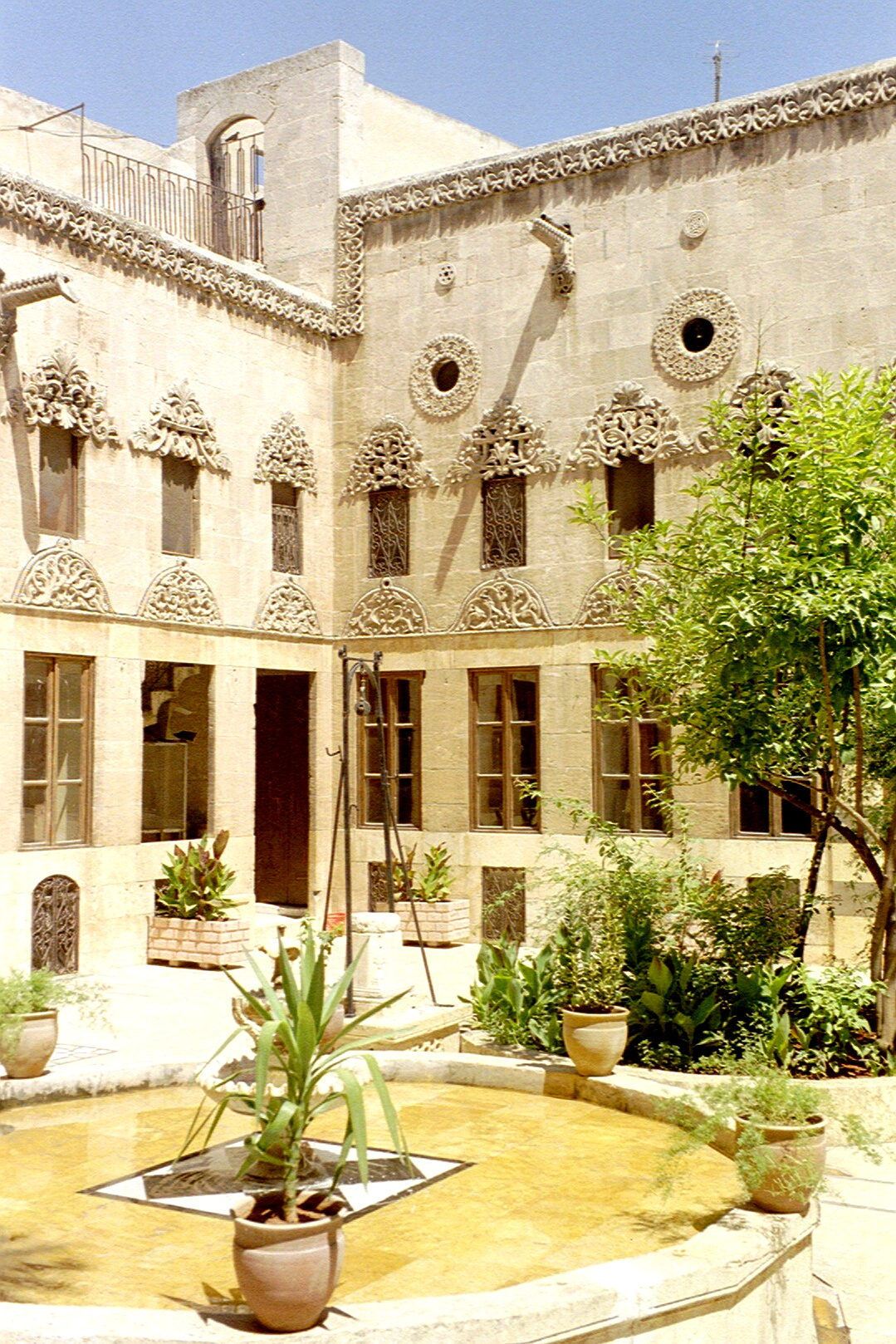
Courtyard of the Ajikbash House Museum

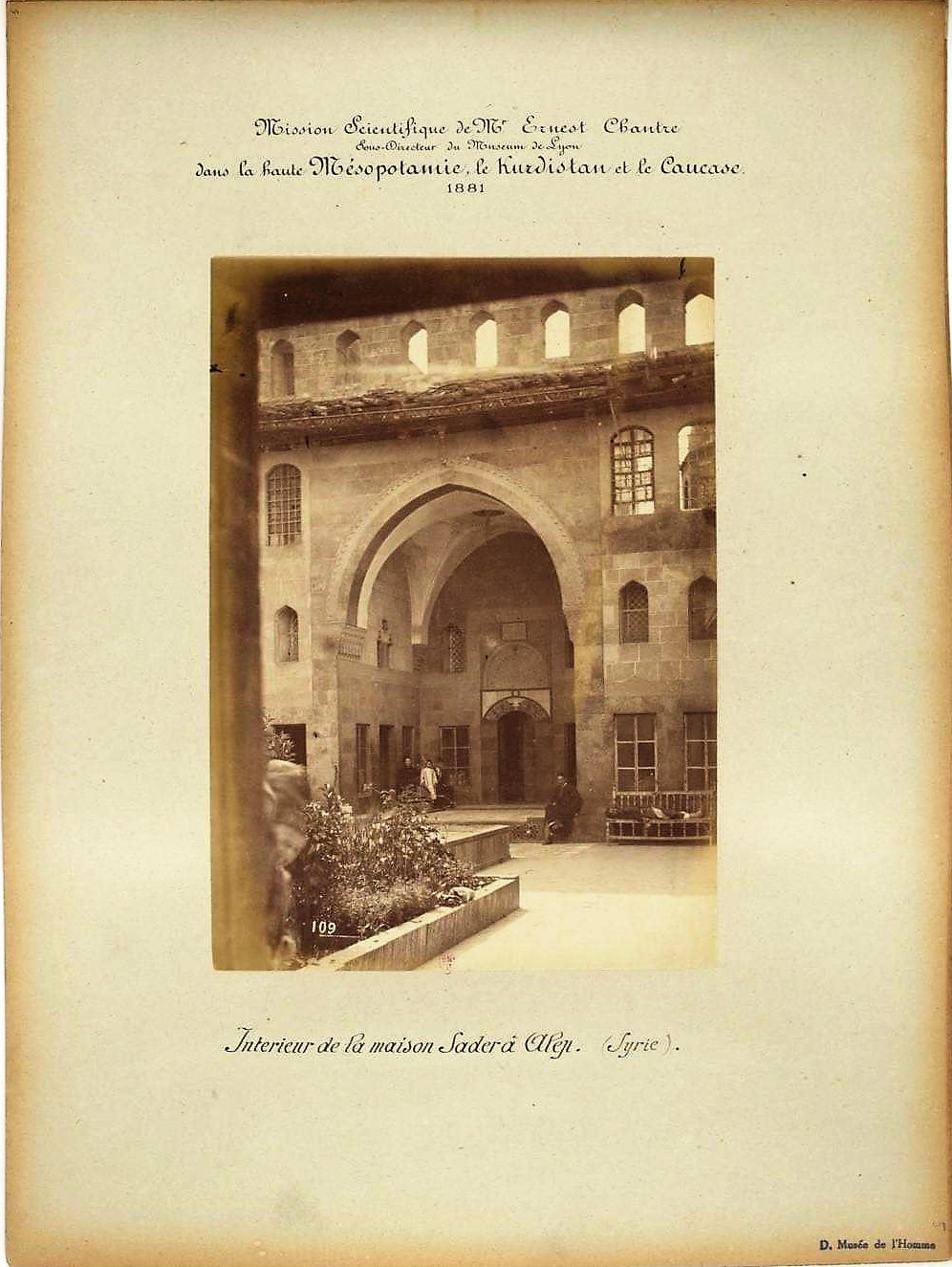
Interior of the Maison (Beit) Sader as seen in 1880

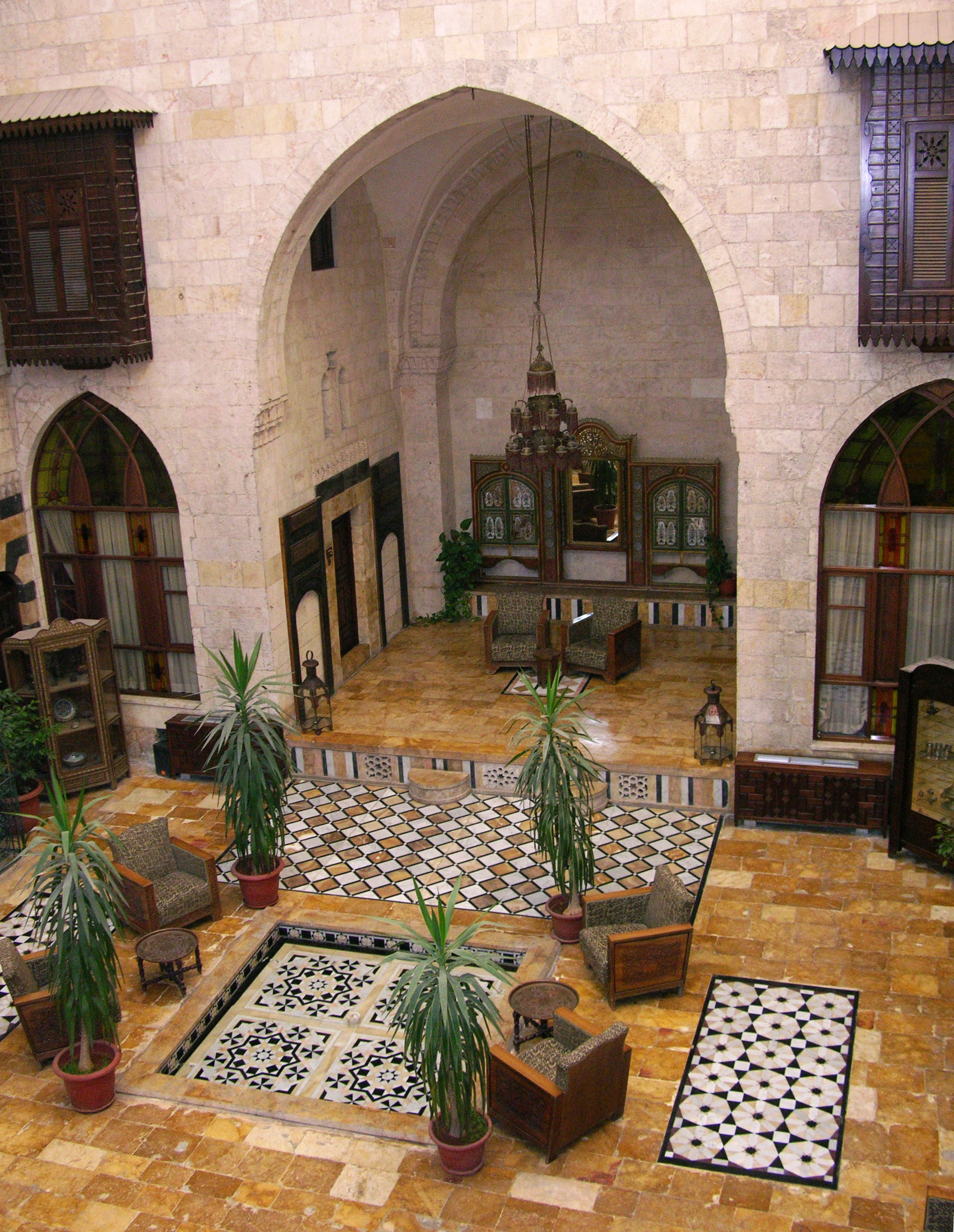
Dar Zamaria, a mansion converted into boutique hotel

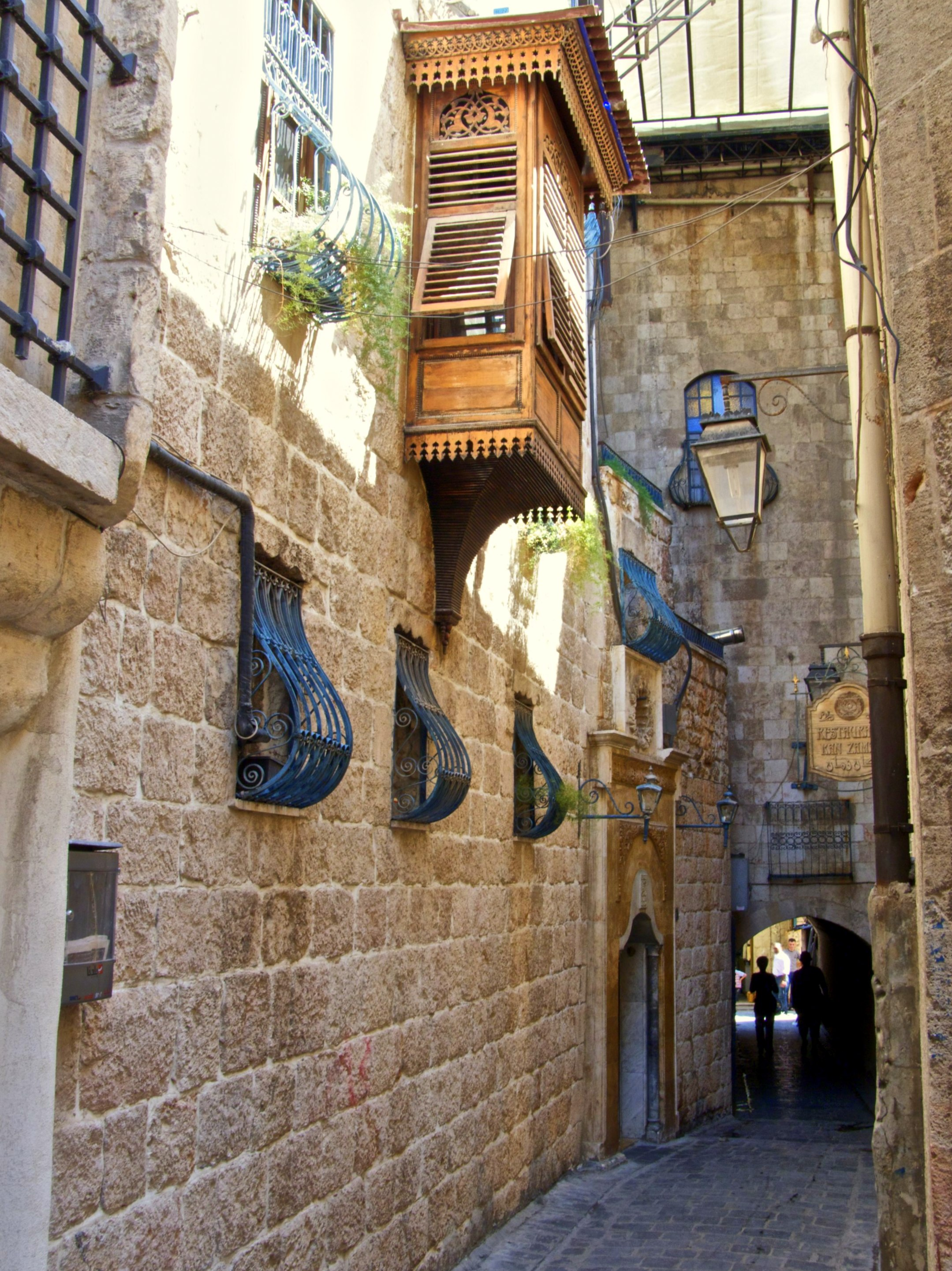
Al-Yasmeen alley in al-Jdayde

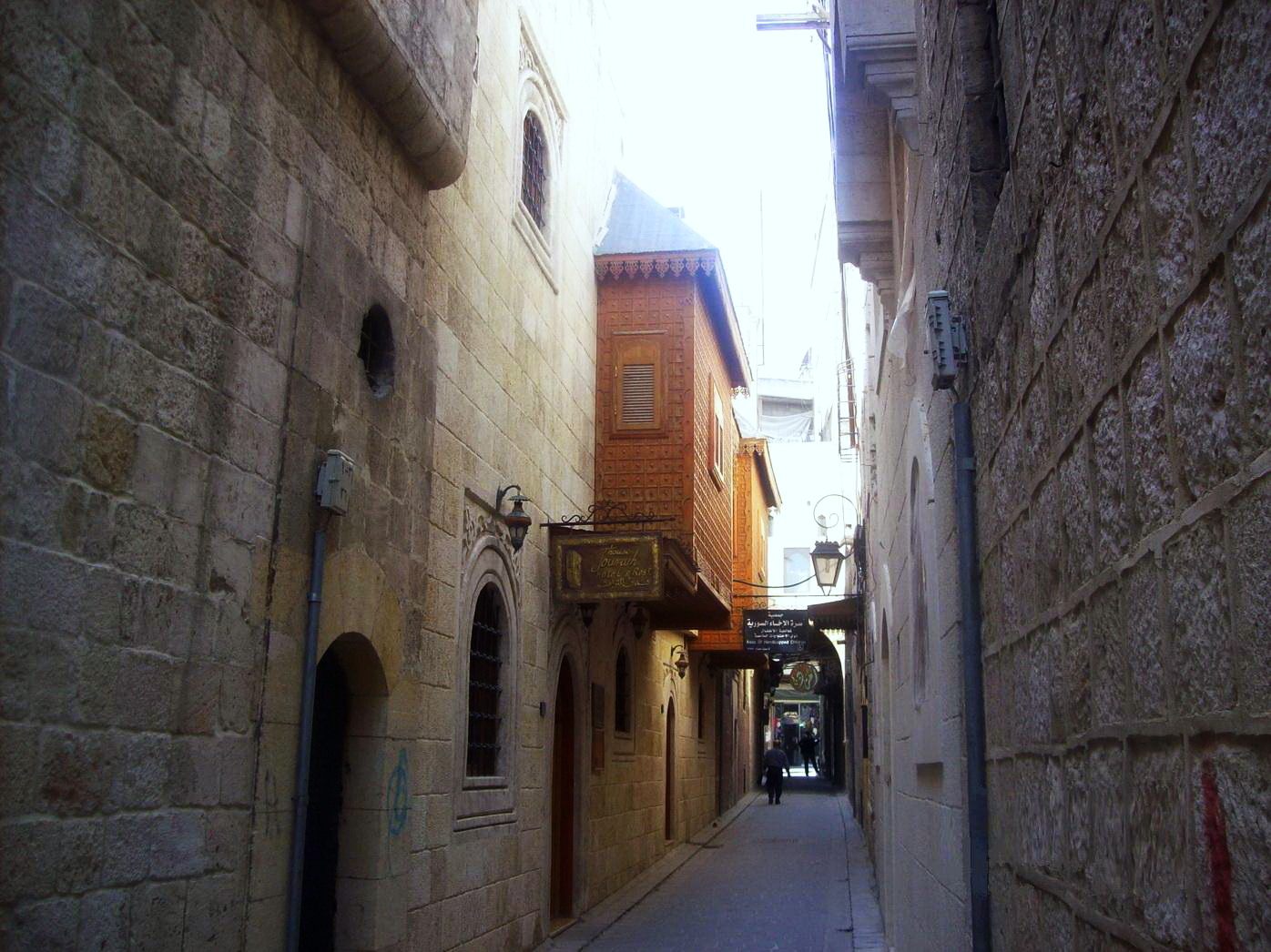
Dar Basile in al-Jdayde

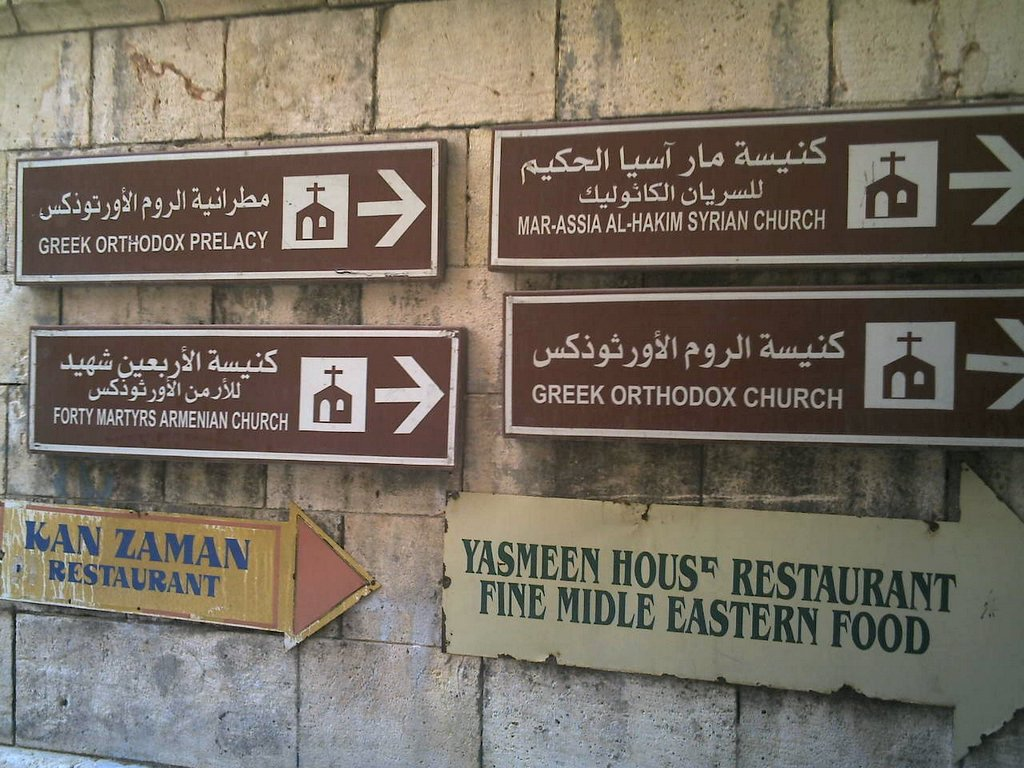
Bilingual street signs referring to church locations in al-Jdayde

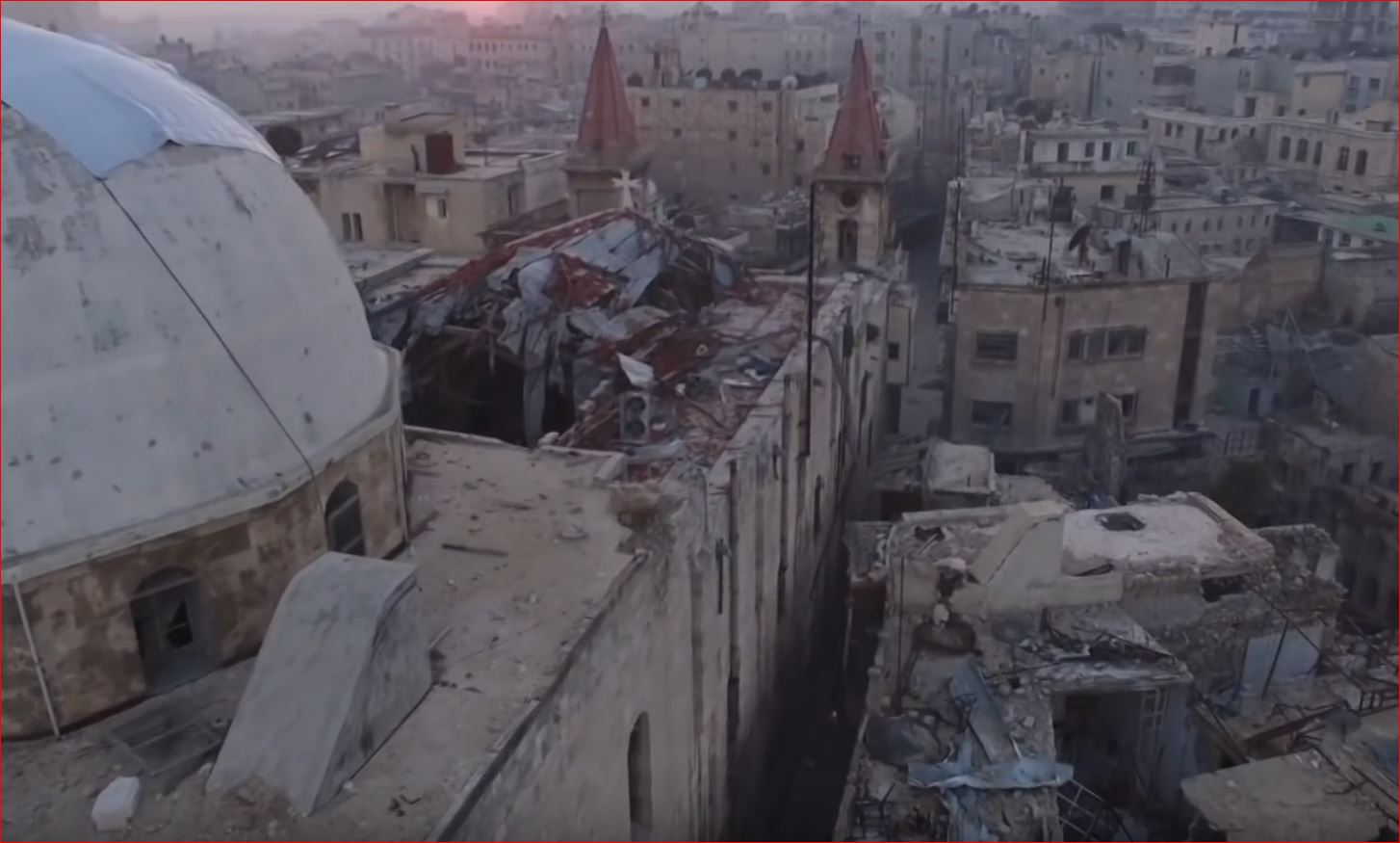
St Elijah cathedral in 2016 damaged by explosions

== See also ==
- Christianity in Syria
- Sahat al Hatab
- Sahat al Farhat
- Beit Achijbash
- Beit Ghazaleh
- Waqf of Ibshir Mustafa Pasha Complex

== Bibliography ==
- David, Jean-Claude (1990), "L'espace des chrétiens à Alep. Ségrégation et mixité, stratégies communautaires (1750–1850)." Revue du monde musulman et de la Méditerranée, 55–56:1–2, pp. 150–170; "The Battle of Aleppo (2012–2016): Destruction of the Ghazala House (Beit Ghazaleh)". Syrian-Heritage Archive - Staatliche Museen zu Berlin (undated)
- Edhem Eldem, Daniel Goffman, and Bruce Masters (1999), "The Ottoman City between East and West: Aleppo, Izmir, and Istanbul." Cambridge: Cambridge University Press, pp. 244.
- Watenpaugh, Heghnar Zeitlian (2004), "The image of an Ottoman city: imperial architecture and urban experience in Aleppo in the 16th and 17th centuries", Leiden: E.J. Brill, pp. 278.
- Salle, Eusèbe de, (1840) Pérégrinations en Orient, ou Voyage pittoresque, historique et politique en Égypte, Nubie, Syrie, Turquie, Grèce pendant les années 1837-38-39. T. 2, Pagnerre (Paris) p. 194–200.
- Ebru Miroğlu (2005) "The transformation of urban space at the conjunction of the old and new districts: the city of Aleppo" [MSc Thesis] Middle East Technical University (Ankara)
- Ross Burns & Stefan Knost (2020) "Judayda Churches | كنائس الجْدَيْدِة". L.I.S.A. WISSENSCHAFTSPORTAL GERDA HENKEL STIFTUNG (in English and Arabic).
- Winter, S., & Ade, M. (Eds.). (2020). Aleppo and its Hinterland in the Ottoman Period / Alep et sa province à l’époque ottomane. Leiden, The Netherlands: Brill.
- Momdjian, M. (2017). The Levantine Merchant Consuls of Aleppo; The Commercial Elites 1750- 1850. UCLA Electronic Theses and Dissertations
- Salahieh, D., Asaeed, S., & Zibar, L. (2024). (Re)calibrating heritage: Al-Jdeideh (post-)conflict transformations in Aleppo, Syria. Journal of Social Archaeology, 24(1), 79-105.
