= Aina =

Aina may refer to:

- Aina (given name)

== Places ==
- Aina (Crete), a town of ancient Crete
- Aïna River, a river in Cameroon and Gabon
- Aina, Iran, a village in Kermanshah Province, Iran

== Art and entertainment ==
- Aina (1977 film), a 1977 Pakistani film
- Aina (2013 film), a Pakistani romantic drama film
- Aina (German band), a 2003 progressive metal supergroup, and their album, Aina, Days of Rising Doom
- Aina (Russian band) – Russian ethno-music group
- Aina (book), a Nepalese book by Ramlal Joshi
- Aina Indou, a character from the .hack// franchise

== Acronyms ==
- AINA (organization), a French non-governmental organization based in Kabul
- Arctic Institute of North America, a research institute and educational organization located in the University of Calgary
- Association of Inland Navigation Authorities, Membership organisation for navigation authorities in the UK
- Assyrian International News Agency

== Other uses ==
- Aina the End, a Japanese singer and idol

== See also ==
- Aaina (disambiguation)
- Ainapur (disambiguation)
- Ina (disambiguation)
