= Ainapur =

Ainapur may refer to:

- Ainapur, Athni, a village in Belgaum district, Karnataka, India
- Ainapur, Bijapur, a village in Bijapur district, Karnataka, India
- Ainapur, Chincholi, a village in Gulbarga district, Karnataka, India
- Ainapur, Jevargi, a village in Gulbarga district, Karnataka, India
- Ainapur, Shorapur, a village in Gulbarga district, Karnataka, India

== See also ==
- Aina (disambiguation)
