= Greek Orthodox Archdiocese of Aleppo =

Archdiocese of the Antioch Orthodox Church

Archdiocese of Aleppo
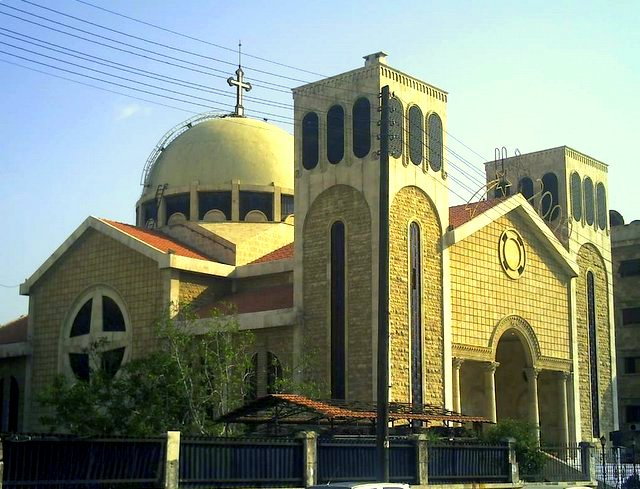
- St Elias Church in Aleppo

Location
- Country: Syria, Lebanon, Turkey
- Headquarters: Aleppo, Syria

Statistics
- Population: Total: 2600 families

Information
- Language: Greek, Arabic

Current leadership
- Patriarch: Patriarch of Antioch John X
- Metropolitan: Ephraim (Maalouli)

The Archdiocese of Aleppo (Arabic: مطرانية حلب للروم الأرثوذكس, romanized: mṭrāny ḥlb llrwm ālrṯwḏks) is an archdiocese of the Antiochian Orthodox Church. It has been headed by Metropolitan Ephraim of Aleppo since 2021. Its territory includes the entirety of Syria, and parts of Lebanon and Turkey.

== History ==
The diocese has existed since at least 1724, serving primarily the Greek and Arab Christian population. In 1818, there was a riot between the Orthodox and Catholic population in Aleppo, and in 1850 there was a pogrom against the Christian community instigated by the Muslim community.

During the Syrian Civil War, the metropolitan Paul Yazigi, along with Syriac Orthodox Archbishop of Aleppo Yohanna Ibrahim by militants on April 22, 2013; as of 2023 they are still missing.

Most of the Christian community has fled due to the ensuring civil war and resulting sectarianism. In December 2024, the Greek government organized a relief effort to evacuate most of the remaining 50 Greek-speaking Christian families left in Aleppo.

== List of bishops ==
- Nektarios Iordanides (1892 - 1902)
- Epiphanius Al Samra (1902 - 1903)
- Setphanos Mukba (1903 - 1912)
- Raphael Nimer (1912 - 1949)
- Elias Muawad (1949 - 1971)
- Elias Youssef (1971 - 2000)
- Paul Yazigi (2000 - 2021)
  - Basilios Kodseie (2005 - 2010) Archdiocese vicar
- Ephraim Maalouli (2023–present)

== See also ==
- Christian Arabs
- Greeks in Syria
- Eastern Orthodoxy in Syria
- Massacre of Aleppo (1850)
- Catholic–Orthodox clash in Aleppo (1818)
