= Ephraim Maalouli =

Greek Orthodox bishop

His Eminence Ephraim
- Metropolitan of Aleppo, Alexandretta and Dependencies
- Archdiocese: Antioch
- See: Aleppo
- Elected: October 7, 2021
- Installed: December 10, 2021
- Term ended: Incumbent
- Predecessor: Paul (Yazigi)
- Other post: Bishop of Seleukia

Orders
- Ordination: 2007

Personal details
- Born: Elias Maalouli; March 1, 1978 (age 48) Rif Dimashq Governorate, Syria
- Denomination: Greek Orthodox
- Education: Damascus University; University of Athens

Ephraim Maalouli (Arabic: أفرام معلولي, romanized: ʻAbduh mʻlwly; born 1 March 1978) is a Syrian bishop of the Greek Orthodox Patriarchate of Antioch. He has been metropolitan of Aleppo, Alexandretta and Dependencies since 2021.

== Early life and education ==
Ephraim was born on 1 March 1978 in Jdeidet Artouz, near Damascus, Syria. He studied Electrical Engineering at Damascus University, graduating in 2000, and in 2005 he obtained a Bachelor of Arts in Theology from the University of Athens. He was ordained a deacon and priest in 2007, and served in the diocese of Europe. In 2008 he obtain two master's degrees in Theology and Greek Literature. In 2011 he was selected as auxiliary bishop for the Metropolitan of Europe He pursued a Ph.D. in Greek literature in 2012. He was elected Patriarchal Vicar and Secretary of the Holy Synod in 2013. On 16 November 2016, he held a meeting with the directors of the patriarchal schools in Damascus and the Syrian Minister of Education, Hazwan Alwaz. On 28 July 2021, as Bishop of Seleukia he visited Kyiv on invitation from Metropolitan Onufriy Berezovsky and delivered a homily about the role Orthodoxy has played in the history of Ukraine and how it has helped uplift the nation.

== Metropolitan of Aleppo ==
Ephraim was elected Metropolitan of Aleppo on 7 October 2021 and enthroned on 10 December 2021 in Aleppo, after over 8 years of the abduction of Metropolitan Paul Yazigi. The ceremony was attended by high-ranking members of various churches, including Metropolitans George of Homs, Ghattas of Baghdad and Kuwait, and Nicholas of Hama, as well as Cardinal Mario Zenari on behalf of the Vatican, and representatives from the Church of Cyprus and the Syrian parliament. His previous post as Bishop of Seleucia and Pamphylia was succeeded by Theodoros Meimares in 2023.

As Bishop, Ephraim has called for the protection of Christians in Syria and cited concerns over the financial status of the church. In the aftermath of the 2023 Syrian Earthquakes, Ephraim offered shelter, food and blankets for roughly 1600 survivors. At least two churches were destroyed and one priest killed due to the aftershocks. On 26 June 2024 Ephraim announced the reconstruction of a theater with assistance from the Middle East Council of Churches. Citing hardships from the earthquakes, the Syrian Civil War, and poor economy, Ephraim has reached out to and coordinated with many charitable groups for support. In 2023, Ephraim led a delegation with Metropolitan Athanasius of Latakia providing aid to the Gaza strip during the Gaza war.

In the aftermath of the Fall of the Assad regime, conditions of Christians in Aleppo have considerably improved, as Christmas holidays were celebrated in the streets in 2024. Metropolitan Ephraim called on Hay'at Tahrir al-Sham and the Syrian Salvation Government to ensure the safety of Christians in Aleppo and for peaceful coexistence between Muslims and Christians. Following the Fall of Aleppo to rebel forces, Ephraim reported that no looting or destruction of Christian monuments or places of worship has happened within Aleppo, however he did express concern over Christians in more rural areas. Ephraim also coordinated with volunteer groups to ensure the safety of Christians in Aleppo during the transitional period of the Syrian government, as well as financial assistance due to the closure of banks during the transition of the new government. Ephraim also coordinated with volunteer groups to ensure the safety of Christians in Aleppo during the transitional period of the Syrian government.

Ephraim has emphasized multiple times he would remain in Aleppo despite any danger. On 1 December 2024, reports emerged of a terrorist plot to abduct and behead Ephraim.

== See also ==
- Arab Christians
- Eastern Orthodoxy in Syria
- Sectarianism and minorities in the Syrian civil war
- Hanna Jallouf

Eastern Orthodox Church titles
Preceded by Paul Yazigi	Metropolitan of Aleppo; 2021–present	Succeeded by Incumbent
