= Cathedral of Elijah the Prophet, Aleppo =

Greek Orthodox church in Aleppo, Syria

Cathedral of Elijah the Prophet
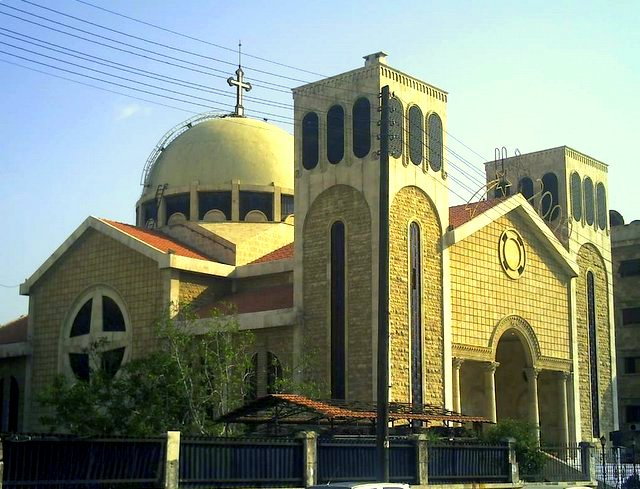
- Cathedral of Elijah the Prophet

- Location in Aleppo

Religion
- Affiliation: Greek Orthodox Church
- Region: Aleppo

Location
- Location: Al-Jdayde quarter, Aleppo, Syria
- Territory: Greek Orthodox Archdiocese of Aleppo and Alexandretta
- Coordinates: 36.216944°N 37.154444°E

Architecture
- Type: Church
- Completed: 2000

Specifications
- Dome: 1
- Materials: brick

Cathedral of Elijah the Prophet (Arabic: كاتدرائية النبي إلياس) is a Greek Orthodox church in Jdeydeh quarter of Aleppo, Syria. The church belongs the Greek Orthodox Prelacy, the Diocese of Aleppo. It was consecrated in December 2000 as the new Greek Cathedral in Aleppo.

== Design ==
The cathedral is a brick church, with a two-tower facade, topped with a dome.

== History ==
The Cathedral of Elijah the Prophet was built in the late 20th century and consecrated on December 17, 2000. It replaced the historic Church of the Dormition of Our Lady as the Greek Cathedral for the city. With its consecration it became the new cathedral of the Greek Orthodox diocese of Aleppo.

In April 2013 during the Syrian civil war, the Greek Orthodox Archbishop Paul (Yazigi), who resided in the cathedral, was kidnapped together with the Syrian Orthodox Archbishop Gregorios Yohanna Ibrahim by forces allegedly loyal to the Islamic State of Iraq and the Levant. The two clergymen have not appeared since then, and the Greek Orthodox Cathedral of the Prophet Elijah has been without an archbishop since 2013. In the End of 2021 eventually Bishop Ephraim Maalouli was appointed as new archbishop.

== See also ==
- List of churches in Aleppo
