= Aaina =

Aaina may refer to:

- Aaina (1944 film), an Indian Hindi-language film directed by S. M. Yusuf starring Trilok Kapoor
- Aval Oru Thodar Kathai, an Indian Tamil-language directed by K. Balachander, released as Aaina in Hindi
- Aaina (1974 film), an Indian Hindi-language film directed by K. Balachander starring Rajesh Khanna
- Aaina (1993 film), an Indian Hindi-language film directed by Deepak Sareen starring Jackie Shroff, Amrita Singh and Juhi Chawla
- Aaina - Roop Nahin, Haqeeqat Bhi Dikhaye, an Indian Hindi-language television series aired on Dangal TV, starring Farman Haider and Niharika Chouksey
- "Aaina", a 2020 Indian song by Monali Thakur and Ranajoy Bhattacharjee, starring Anushka Sen in its music video

== See also ==
- Aina (disambiguation)
