= Elias Youssef =

Greek Orthodox bishop

Elias (Youssef) was the Metropolitan of Aleppo, a diocese of the Greek Orthodox Church of Antioch from 1971 to 2000.

== Biography ==
Youssef was born in Tartous, Syria on August 1, 1931. He began his theological education at Balamand Monastery followed by the Universities of Athens and Thessalonica in Greece. He was elected to the Metropolis of Aleppo in 1971 and was consecrated metropolitan by Patriarch Elias (Muawad) IV and Metropolitans Ignatius of Lattakia, Athansios of Hama, Constantine of Bagdad, and Alexis of Homs.

Metropolitan Elias died on August 6, 2000 at the age of 69.

Eastern Orthodox Church titles
Preceded by Elias (Muawad)	Metropolitan of Aleppo; 1971 – 2000	Succeeded by Paul Yazigi
