= Ainapur, Jevargi =

Ainapur
- village
- Ainapur, chincholi is in Gulbarga district
- Interactive map of Ainapur
- Country: India
- State: Karnataka
- District: Gulbarga
- Talukas: chincholi

Government
  - Body: Village Panchayat

Languages
  - Official: Kannada
- Time zone: UTC+5:30 (IST)
- Nearest city: Gulbarga
- Civic agency: Village Panchayat

Ainapur, Chincholi is a village in the southern state of Karnataka, India. It is located in the Chincholi taluk of Kalaburagi district in Karnataka.

== See also ==
- Gulbarga
- Districts of Karnataka
