= Aineh =

Aineh ائينه
- Village
- Location within Iran
- Coordinates: 34°27′45″N 45°55′25″E
- Country: Iran
- Province: Kermanshah
- County: Sarpol-e Zahab
- Bakhsh: Central
- Rural District: Beshiva Pataq

Population (2006)
  - Total: 674
- Time zone: UTC+3:30 (IRST)
  - Summer (DST): UTC+4:30 (IRDT)

Aineh (Persian: ائينه, also Romanized as Ā’īneh; also known as Āina and Ā’īneh Vand) is a village in Beshiva Pataq Rural District, in the Central District of Sarpol-e Zahab County, Kermanshah Province, Iran. At the 2006 census, its population was 674, in 147 families.
