= Aina (Crete) =

Ancient town in Crete

Coordinates: 35°03′48″N 24°54′33″E

Aina was a town of ancient Crete.

Its site is tentatively located near Kastelli.
