= Ainapur, Shorapur =

Ainapur
- Village
- Location within Karnataka Location within India
- Coordinates: 16°38′13″N 076°28′09″E
- Country: India
- State: Karnataka
- District: Yadgir district
- Taluka: Shorapur

Government
  - Type: Panchayat raj
  - Body: Gram panchayat

Population (2001)
  - Total: 493

Languages
  - Official: Kannada
- Time zone: UTC+5:30 (IST)
- ISO 3166 code: IN-KA
- Vehicle registration: KA
- Website: karnataka.gov.in

Ainapur is a village in the southern state of Karnataka, India. Administratively, Ainapur is under the Yaktapur gram panchayat, Shorapur Taluka of Yadgir District in Karnataka.

== Demographics ==
As of 2001 census, Ainapur had 493 inhabitants, with 245 males and 248 females.

== See also ==
- Yadgir
