= Aïna River =

River in Republic of the Congo

Coordinates: 1°48′N 13°18′E

The Aïna River (French: Rivière Aïna) is a tributary of the Ivindo River that rises in Cameroon. Along the way it forms the border between Cameroon and Gabon and then the border between Gabon and Republic of the Congo (Map.).

The native pygmies along the river were noted as some of the few to use the plant Strophanthus tholonii as an ingredient in their arrow poison; other Strophanthus species are more commonly used.

== See also ==
- Communes of Cameroon
