= Conscription in Syria =

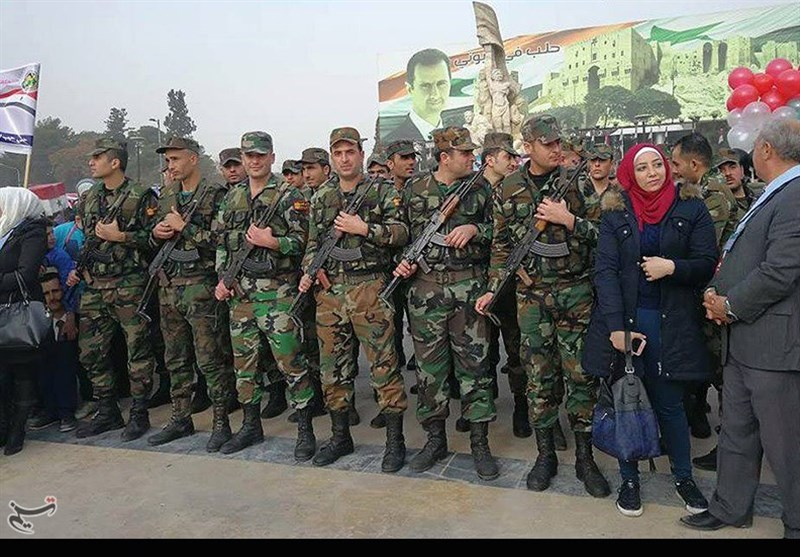
Syrian Soldiers in Saadallah al-Jabiri Square in Aleppo in 2018

Conscription in Syria, officially known as the Service of the Flag (Arabic: خدمة العلم, romanized: Khidmat al-ʿAlam, lit. 'Service of the Flag'), was a mandatory obligation for all Syrian males under the authority of the Syrian Arab Army and regulated by the Syrian Ministry of Defense.

The system had undergone significant changes since its inception and continued to play a central role in the state's military recruitment and national defense strategy up until the fall of the Assad regime in December 2024 when the mandatory obligation was abolished, and service in the Syrian Armed Forces became entirely voluntary.

== History ==
Months before the end of the French Mandate for Syria, in August 1945, Syrian President Shukri al-Quwatli announced the creation of the Syrian army from the remnants of the French "Troupes Spéciales du Levant". To diversify and expand the army, conscription was ratified by the Syrian parliament in 1947. The Syrian government retained conscription as a core element of its national defense policy. During the Ba'athist era, especially under President Hafez al-Assad between 1971–2000, military service was deeply institutionalized as part of state ideology and nation-building efforts.

The service period has varied historically. In 2005, the service duration was reduced to 24 months, and in 2011, it was shortened to between 18 and 21 months, depending on their level of education, amid political pressure and economic challenges. However, the onset of the Syrian civil war in 2011 dramatically altered the structure and experience of conscription, with thousands being retained beyond their official terms for up to 9 years or more, and widespread mobilization campaigns targeting youth and reservists.

== Legislation ==
Article 46 of the 2012 Syrian constitution, the last constitution under the Ba'athist regime, stated that "[compulsory] military service shall be a sacred duty and is regulated by a law".

The latest legal foundation for conscription was the Military Service Law No. 30 of 2007, which outlined the obligations, exemptions, and penalties related to military duty. According to the law, all Syrian males aged 18 were required to serve unless granted exemption or deferment. The law granted wide discretion to the Ministry of Defense and military leadership to interpret and implement regulations, especially during times of war.

Palestinians in Syria and their children on the date of the issuance of Law No. 260 of 10 July 1956 are treated as Syrians with regard to the military service law, while retaining their original nationality. Syria was the only Arab state that drafted non-citizen Palestinians into its army.

== Evasion ==
Draft evasion became increasingly common especially after the outbreak of the civil war. Many young Syrians sought refuge abroad to avoid conscription, particularly among those opposed to the Assad regime or unwilling to serve in prolonged combat. Evasion was considered a criminal offense under Syrian law and could lead to imprisonment, fines, or property confiscation. The Ba'athist government conducted campaigns to locate and detain draft evaders and had sometimes barred their them and families from accessing public services as a form of coercion.

== Registration and inspection ==
All Syrian males were required to register for military service and get their military booklet upon reaching age 18. The process begins with local military recruitment branches (Arabic: شُعب التجنيد), which maintained records and managed the scheduling of medical examinations and call-ups, and depending on the results of the medical examination conducted, a person would be placed in one of two categories if not exempted: "field service" (Arabic: خدمة ميدانية) or "stationary service" (Arabic: خدمة ثابتة). Periodic inspection campaigns were conducted to locate evaders or those who failed to report, and checks were commonly made by scanning one's identity card against stored records when they pass by a checkpoint.

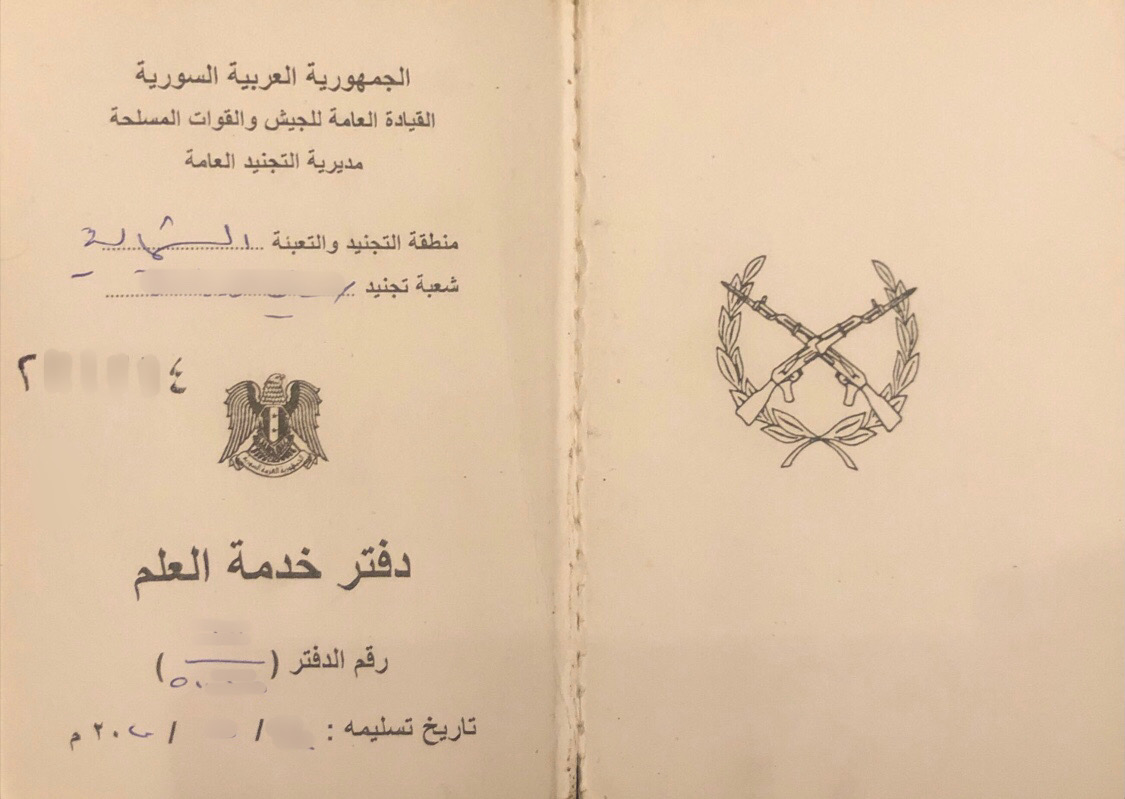
Cover of the Syrian Military Booklet

Males aged between 17 and 47 who want to obtain a passport or leave the country had to get a permit from their recruitment branch in advance.

== Induction and placement ==
Upon being called to service, conscripts used to undergo basic military training at assigned barracks. After training, they were allocated to units within the Syrian Arab Army or affiliated branches, including intelligence services or paramilitary groups. Assignment often depended on educational level, medical status, and operational needs.

During the Syrian civil war, placement often meant direct deployment to combat zones, with very little to no military training.

== Postponement and exemption ==
Postponement of service was possible for highschool and university students, family caretakers, or those with temporary health conditions. Postponement required annual renewal and was conditional on continuing studies or other qualifying circumstances.

=== Grounds for exemption ===
Exemptions were granted under specific circumstances, including:

- Medical incapacity (physical or psychological).
- Being the only male child to either or both of the parents.
- Religious exemptions for clergy of Christianity and Islam.
- Living abroad for a specified period and paying exemption fees.
- Those who completed at least 5 years of service in the internal security services, including in the police.

These exemptions required official documentation and were subject to government approval.

Syrian Jews were exempt from conscription and banned from volunteering in the military.

An exemption could also be obtained for those who were living or had previously lived abroad through a financial payment as follows according to the latest amendment applied, issued by president Bashar al-Assad in 2020:

- 10,000 US$ for those who spent a period of over a year but under two years.
- 9,000 US$ for those who spent a period of more than two years but under three years.
- 8,000 US$ for those who spent more than three years but under 4 years.
- 7,000 US$ for those who spent fours or more years.
- 6,500 US$ for those who were born abroad and spent at least ten years living abroad prior to turning 18 years old.
- 6,500 US$ for those who were born abroad and spent more than ten years but less than 17 years living abroad prior to turning 18 years old, with 500 US$ subtracted for every year after the tenth year until the 17th year.
- 3,000 US$ for those who were born abroad and spent all of their life abroad prior to turning 18 years old.

In addition to the following special cases:

- 15,000 US$ for all civilian pilots.
- 10,000 US$ for pilots working for Syrian Air who had military service postponement in accordance with Article 10, Paragraph 2 of the Military Service Law for a period of five consecutive years, or who had completed five years of actual service with the organization and continued to practice the profession.
- 6,000 US$ for those sent abroad to study on the expense of the government for postgraduate education and obtained the postgraduate degree for which they were sent, being at least a master's degree, and resided in the country they were sent to for the period specified in accordance with applicable laws and regulations.

The payment had to be made in full, in cash, exclusively in US dollars or Euros, at a designated government bank or through one of Syria’s diplomatic missions abroad.

Prior to the 2020, the law required individuals to have lived abroad for a minimum of five years to qualify for the standard exemption fee of 8,000 US$, with extra fees being added to those who were late for payment beyond their time of eligibility.

The amendment also introduced an option for individuals who did not meet the residency requirement abroad to pay a fee of 3,000 US$ or its equivalent in Syrian lira according to the price set by the Central Bank of Syria, but only if they were designated for stationary (non-combat) military service.

== Retention and recall ==
During wartime or national emergencies, conscripts and reservists could be retained beyond the official service period. After 2011 with the outbreak of the Syrian civil war, many soldiers had remained in service involuntarily for up to a decade or more without official demobilization, leading to widespread discontent.

The Ministry of Defense also maintained a reserve system, allowing for the recall of former conscripts up to the age of 42, or older in times of crisis.

In December 2023, president Bashar al-Assad issued a deceee allowing those called for reserve service who have reached the age of 40 and have not yet joined to pay an exemption fee of 4,800 US$ or its equivalent in Syrian Lira.

The decree also stated that those who have joined reserve service, reached the age of 40, and are still performing their service can pay that fee, with a deduction of 200 US$ or its equivalent in Syrian Lira for each month served.

== Abolishment ==
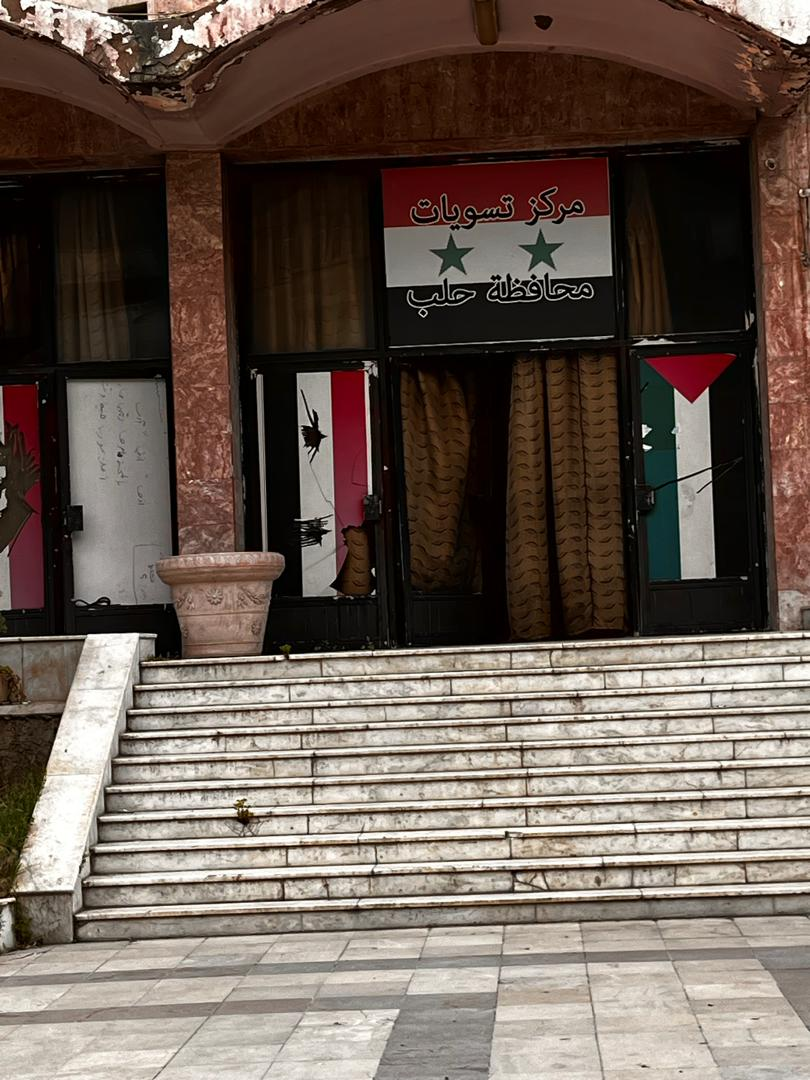
A Military Settlement Center in Aleppo vandalized after the fall of the Assad regime

Following the fall of the Assad regime in December 2024, the new transitional authorities abolished the mandatory conscription in Syria. President Ahmed al-Sharaa confirmed that the country had moved into a voluntary system of service in the armed forces, (Note: Does not include conscription in areas outside the control of the government in the Democratic Autonomous Administration of North and East Syria, see Conscription, training and service in the Self-Defense Forces in Northeastern Syria.) stating that conscription would only be reintroduced in extreme cases, such as national emergencies relating to war.

== See also ==
- Syrian Armed Forces
- Syrian Army
- Conscription, training and service in the Self-Defense Forces in Northeastern Syria
