= Ainapur, Chincholi =

Ainapur
- village
- Ainapur, Chincholi is in Gulbarga district
- Country: India
- State: Karnataka
- District: Gulbarga
- Talukas: Chincholi

Government
  - Body: Village Panchayat

Population (2011)
  - Total: 3,502

Languages
  - Official: Kannada
- Time zone: UTC+5:30 (IST)
- Nearest city: Gulbarga
- Civic agency: Village Panchayat

Ainapur, Chincholi is a village in the northeast state of Karnataka, India. It is located in the Chincholi taluk of Kalaburagi district in Karnataka, near Chitguppa, has two government school namely "sarakari hiriya pratamika sale, Ainapur" and "Govt High School Ainapur", for primary and high school respectively.It is one of the Hobli place among the other four Hobli present in chincholi taluk.

== Politics ==
Ainapur current grama panchayat chairperson is Mr.bansilaal Ainapur Panchayata from the period 2020 to 2025

== Demographics ==
As of 2011 India census Ainapur had a population of 3502 with 1746 males and 1756 females.

== See also ==
- Gulbarga
