= Paul Yazigi =

Syrian metropolitan bishop

His Eminence Paul Yazigi
- Metropolitan of Aleppo
- Archdiocese: Antioch
- See: Aleppo
- Installed: 2000
- Term ended: 2021
- Predecessor: Elias (Youssef)
- Successor: Ephraim (Maalouli)

Personal details
- Born: Bulus Yaziji; 1959 (age 66–67) Latakia, Syria
- Denomination: Greek Orthodox
- Education: Tishreen University; University of Thessaloniki
- Disappeared: 22 April 2013 (aged 53–54)

Metropolitan Paul Yazigi, also Bulus Al-Yaziji (Arabic: بولس اليازجي, romanized: Būlus al-Yāzijī; born 1959) is the metropolitan of the honorary diocese of Diyarbakir, and former metropolitan of the archdiocese of Aleppo, Syria, under the Greek Orthodox Patriarchate of Antioch.

== Life ==
Born in 1959 in the coastal city of Latakia, Syria into a very devout Christian family, he was active in the church as a youth. After graduating in 1985 from Tishreen University with a Civil Engineering degree, he was ordained a deacon and studied theology at the University of Thessaloniki, gaining a Bachelor's degree in 1989, a Master's degree in 1992, and a Doctor of Philosophy. He also studied at Mount Athos.

Paul was ordained to the priesthood in 1992 and was Dean of the Institute of Theology from 1994 to 2000 when he was elected Metropolitan of Aleppo, being enthroned in Aleppo on October 22. He succeeded Youssef (Elias), bishop of Aleppo from 1971 to 2000. His brother is John X, currently the Greek Orthodox Patriarch of Antioch. In 2010, he represented the Greek Orthodox delegation in a meeting of Christian leaders in Aleppo, discussing the importance of protecting the children of their communities and committing support for one another.

=== Kidnapping ===
On April 22, 2013, Paul was abducted by militants during the Syrian Civil War, alongside Syriac Orthodox Archbishop of Aleppo Yohanna Ibrahim, and their whereabouts have remained unknown for several years. The Rewards for Justice Program is offering $5 million for information regarding the ISIS network responsible for the kidnapping of Christian clerics, including Maher Mahfouz, Michael Kayyal, Yohanna Ibrahim, Paolo Dall'Oglio, and Boulos Yazigi. In April 2024, L'Orient-Today published a three-part investigation into the archbishops' disappearance claiming that the Assad regime was responsible for their kidnapping, with Yohanna Ibrahim as the primary target.

In January 2020, an investigative report published by Mansur Salib, a self-described "Syrian citizen in the United States", alleged that both bishops were killed in 2016. In October 2021, the Antiochian Synod in Balamand made the decision to transfer him to the honorary diocese of Diyarbakir due to his remaining in captivity. As of 2025, Bishop Paul is still missing.

The Middle East Council of Churches declared April 22 as "The Ecumenical Day for the Abducted and the Forcibly Absented" in honor of the abducted bishops Paul Yazigi and Yohanna Ibrahim. This was made in a collaborative statement from the Greek Orthodox and Syriac Orthodox Patriarchates of Antioch.

== See also ==
- Arab Christians
- Eastern Orthodoxy in Syria
- Yohanna Ibrahim
- Sectarianism and minorities in the Syrian civil war
- Persecution of Christians by the Islamic State
- List of kidnappings

== Gallery ==
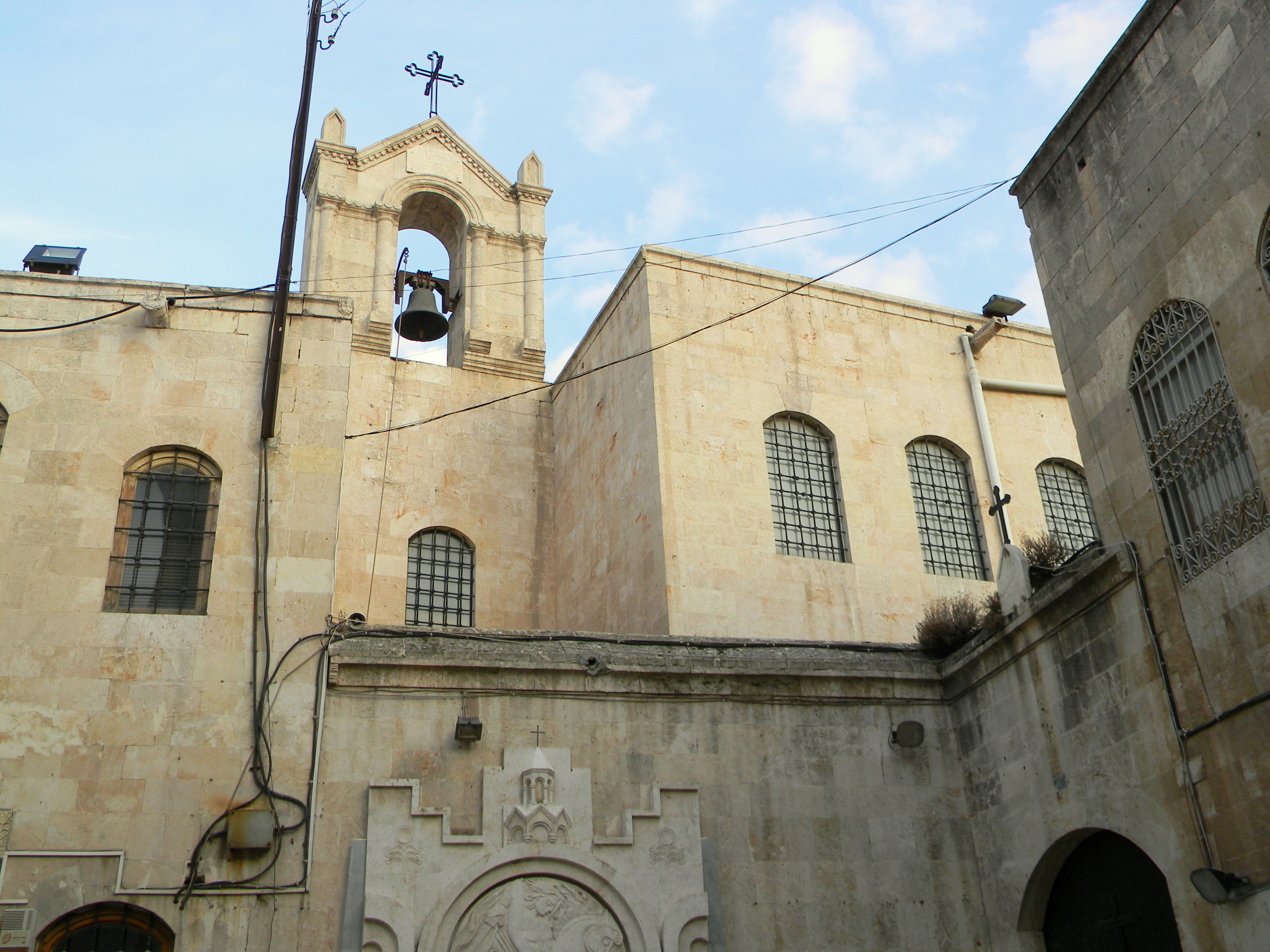
Church of the Dormition of Our Lady Cathedral

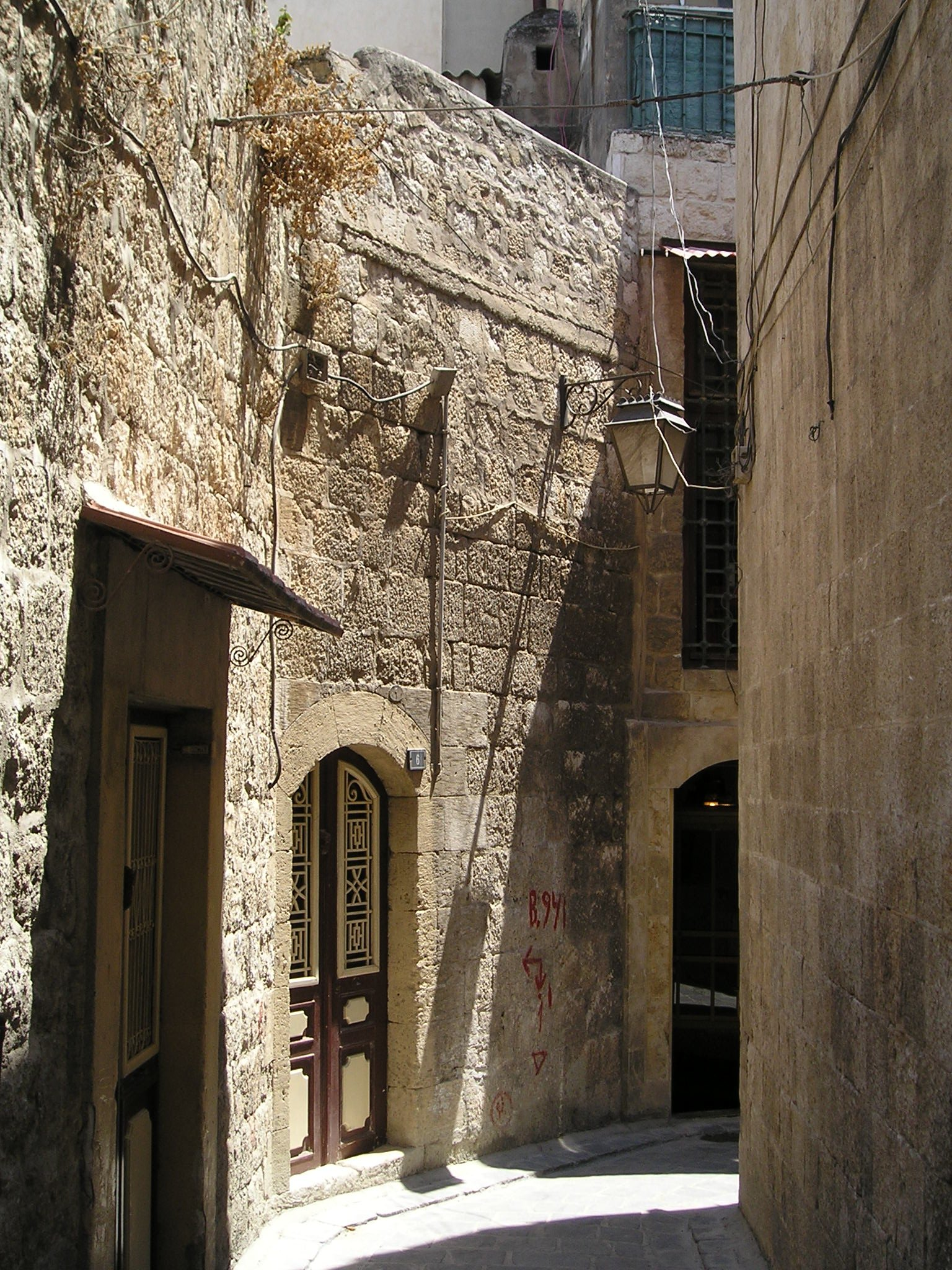
A narrow street in the Christian quarter (Aleppo)

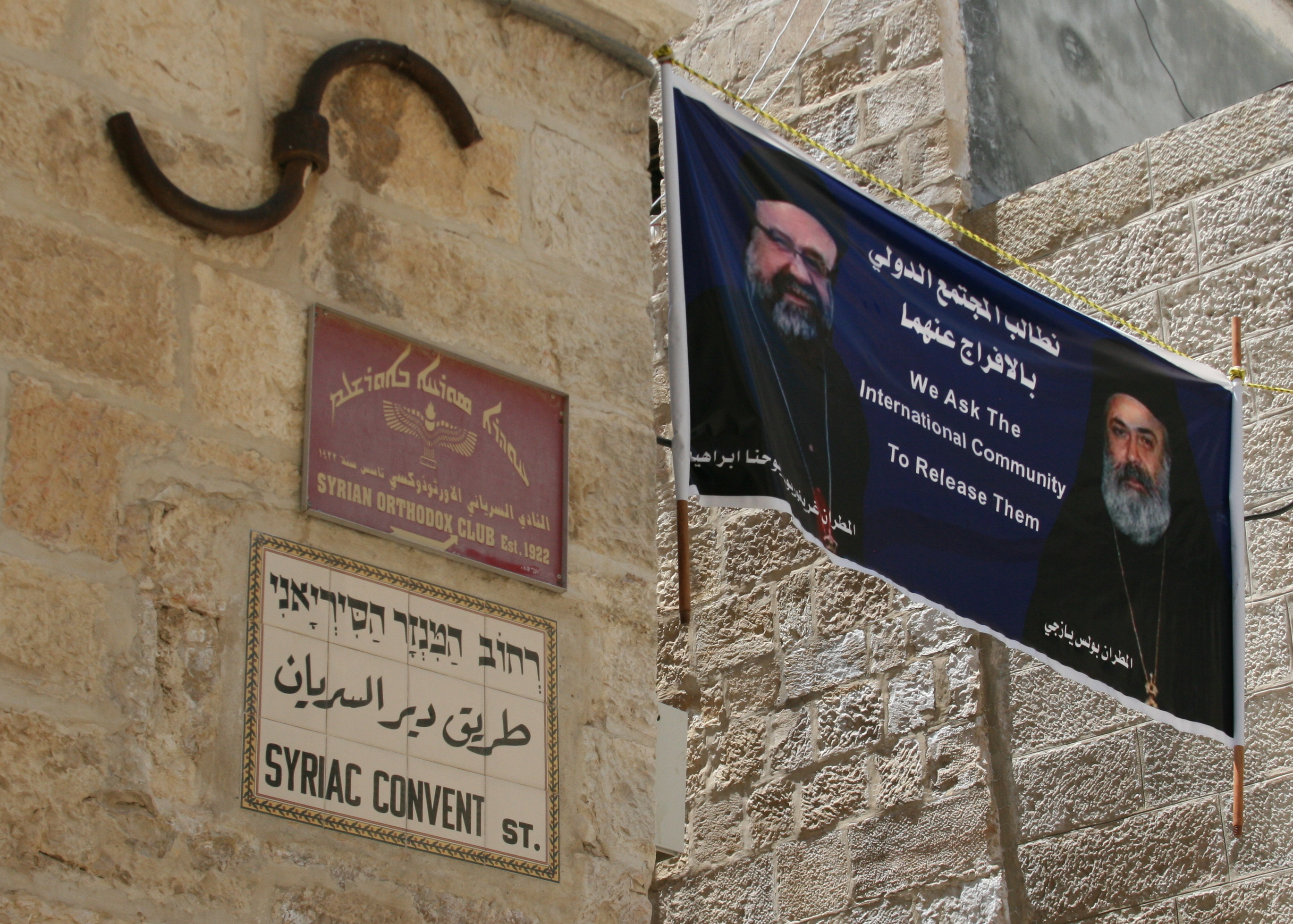
Banner in support of the kidnapped bishops in front of the Monastery of Saint Mark, Jerusalem, in 2013.

Eastern Orthodox Church titles
Preceded by Elias (Youssef)	Metropolitan of Aleppo; 2000 – 2021	Succeeded by Ephraim (Maalouli)
