= Yohanna Ibrahim =

Kidnapped Syriac Orthodox archbishop of Aleppo

His Eminence Gregorios Yohanna Ibrahim
- Archbishop of Aleppo
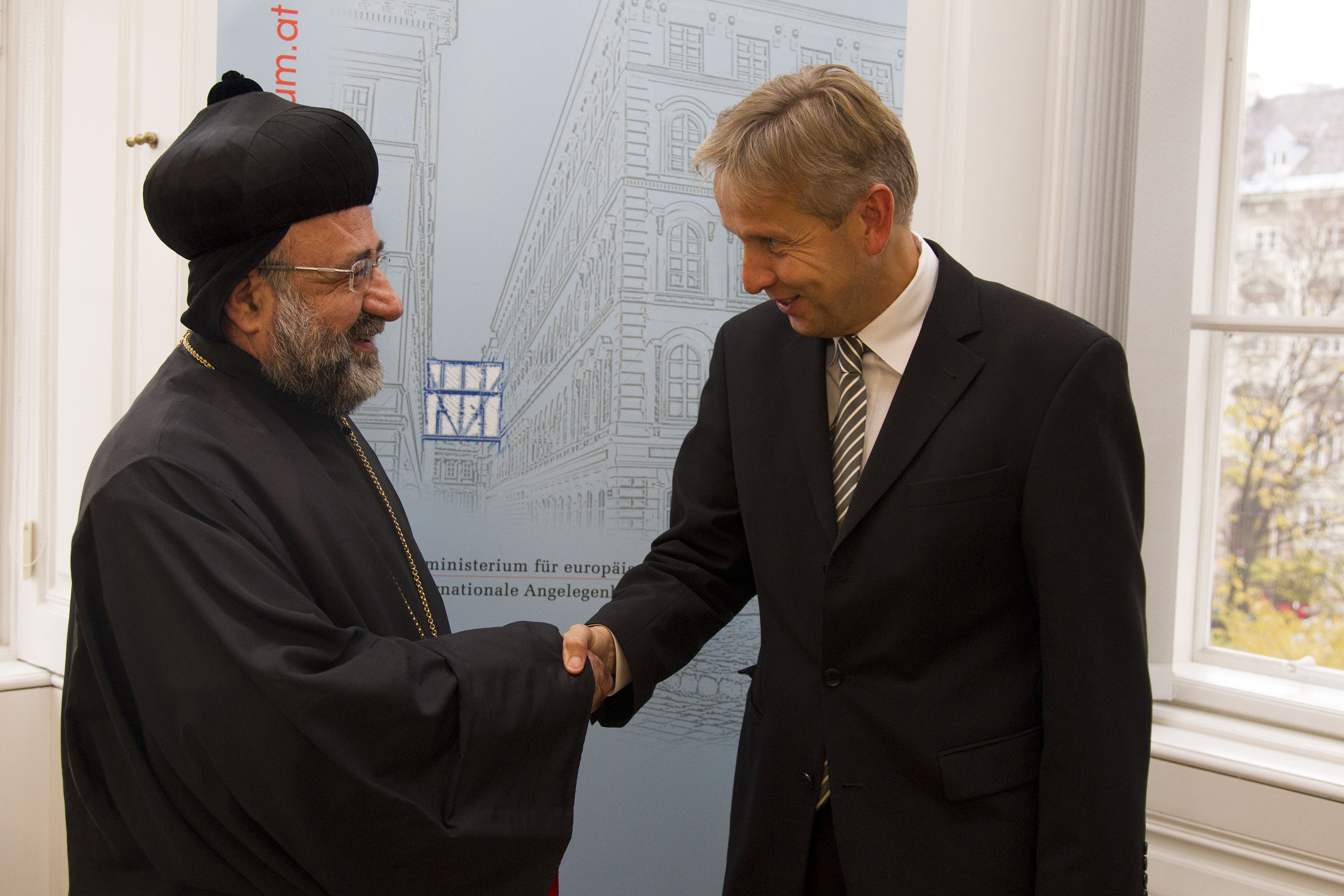
- Archbishop Gregorios Yohanna (left) of the Syriac Orthodox Church of Aleppo with Austrian politician Reinhold Lopatka (right) in 2012
- Native name: ܓܪܝܓܘܪܝܘܣ ܝܘܚܢܢ ܐܝܒܪܗܝܡ غريغوريوس يوحنا ابراهيم
- Archdiocese: Aleppo
- See: Antioch
- Installed: 4 March 1979
- Term ended: 18 October 2019
- Successor: Peter Qissees

Personal details
- Born: 18 August 1948 (age 78) Qamishli, Syria
- Denomination: Syriac Orthodox
- Education: St. Ephrem Theological Seminary (Zahle, Lebanon); Pontifical Oriental Institute; University of Birmingham

Mor Yohanna Ibrahim (Arabic: يوحنا إبراهيم), also known as Gregorios Yohanna Ibrahim (Syriac: ܓܪܝܓܘܪܝܘܣ ܐܒܪܗܡ ܝܘܚܢܢ, romanized: Ğriğōryōs Abrōhōm Yōhannōn) and John Ibrahim, born August 18, 1948, is the Syrian-American former Syriac Orthodox archbishop of Aleppo. He was kidnapped on April 22, 2013, along with Paul Yazigi, the Greek Orthodox metropolitan of Aleppo.

== Life ==
Yohanna Ibrahim was born August 18, 1948, in Qamishli, Syria to devout and faithful parents: Ibrahim Ibrahim and Fahima Qumi. He is the eldest and has five brothers and three sisters. He began his early education in Syriac schools, attending the Al-Hurriya Primary School and the Al-Nahda Syriac Secondary School. In 1962, he enrolled in the St. Ephrem Theological Seminary in Zahle, Lebanon, graduating in 1967 with a diploma in theology and philosophy. That same year, the patriarchate appointed him secretary of the Archdiocese of Mosul, a position he held until 1973. During this period, he also taught religion at the Mar Toma and Orthodox schools, served on the local ecumenical committee, which produced a unified Christian catechism series for all denominations; he authored two volumes in this series and participated in the founding of the journal Between the Rivers, which continues to be published in Iraq.

On 26 July 1973, in the Church of ʿAtshana in Bikfaya, he was ordained monk by the late Patriarch Mor Ignatius Jacob III. That same year, he received a scholarship to study at the Pontifical Oriental Institute in Rome, where he specialized in Eastern ecclesiastical sciences and Eastern canon law. He earned a master's degree in history with highest honors, presenting a thesis entitled The City of Raqqa in Syria and the Famous Monastery of Mor Zakka There, and also obtained a bachelor's degree in Eastern canon law with a "very good" grade, with a thesis entitled The Election of Bishops According to the Letters of Severus of Antioch.

On 15 February 1976, Patriarch Jacob III ordained him to the priesthood in St. George's Cathedral in Damascus. He was then appointed Patriarchal Vicar in Sweden and Patriarchal Visitor to Europe (1976–1977), during which he ministered to Assyrian refugees and migrants in the Netherlands, visited communities across Europe, and founded the first Syriac Orthodox Church in Europe (St. John the Evangelist in Hengelo, Netherlands) consecrated by the Patriarch on 5 June 1977. In September 1977, he became director of the St. Ephrem Theological Seminary in ʿAtshana, reviving it after its closure during the Lebanese Civil War.

In late 1978, he was canonically elected Metropolitan of Aleppo, and on 4 March 1979, was consecrated at St. Ephrem's Cathedral by Patriarch Jacob III, with six bishops, the Papal Nuncio to Syria, and various church leaders present. From 1985 to 1987, he pursued doctoral studies at the University of Birmingham, UK, completing his PhD dissertation Christian Arabs in Mesopotamia before Islam.

=== Episcopate ===
Metropolitan Ibrahim devoted himself to pastoral, administrative, ecumenical, and educational work in his archdiocese, representing the Syriac Orthodox Church of Antioch at dozens of international, regional, and local conferences. He served on many significant committees, including the Central Committee of the World Council of Churches (1980–1998), the Executive Committee of the WCC's Faith and Order Commission (since 1990), the Vatican's Commission for Peoples and Religions (since 1987), the International Orthodox–Orthodox Dialogue Committee, the Oriental Orthodox–Roman Catholic Dialogue (Pro Oriente, since 1983), the Executive Committee for Syriac Dialogue (since 1994, uniting all Syriac traditions worldwide), and the Executive Committee of the Middle East Council of Churches (1999–2003), chairing its Faith and Unity Committee in that period.

He developed education through the Bani Taghlib schools, new religious and social programs, scout troops, and the "Mardin" publishing house, which issued 170 works on Syriac heritage in Syriac, Arabic, and English. He also published catalogues, articles, and lectures internationally.

Reviving the Syriac Bulletin, he oversaw clinics, schools, residences, clubs, computer centers, and church restorations. He reclaimed the Monastery of Tell ʿAda, built new churches and shrines, and established major community services, including a seniors' home, the Syrian-French Hospital, and al-Kalima School.

=== Kidnapping ===
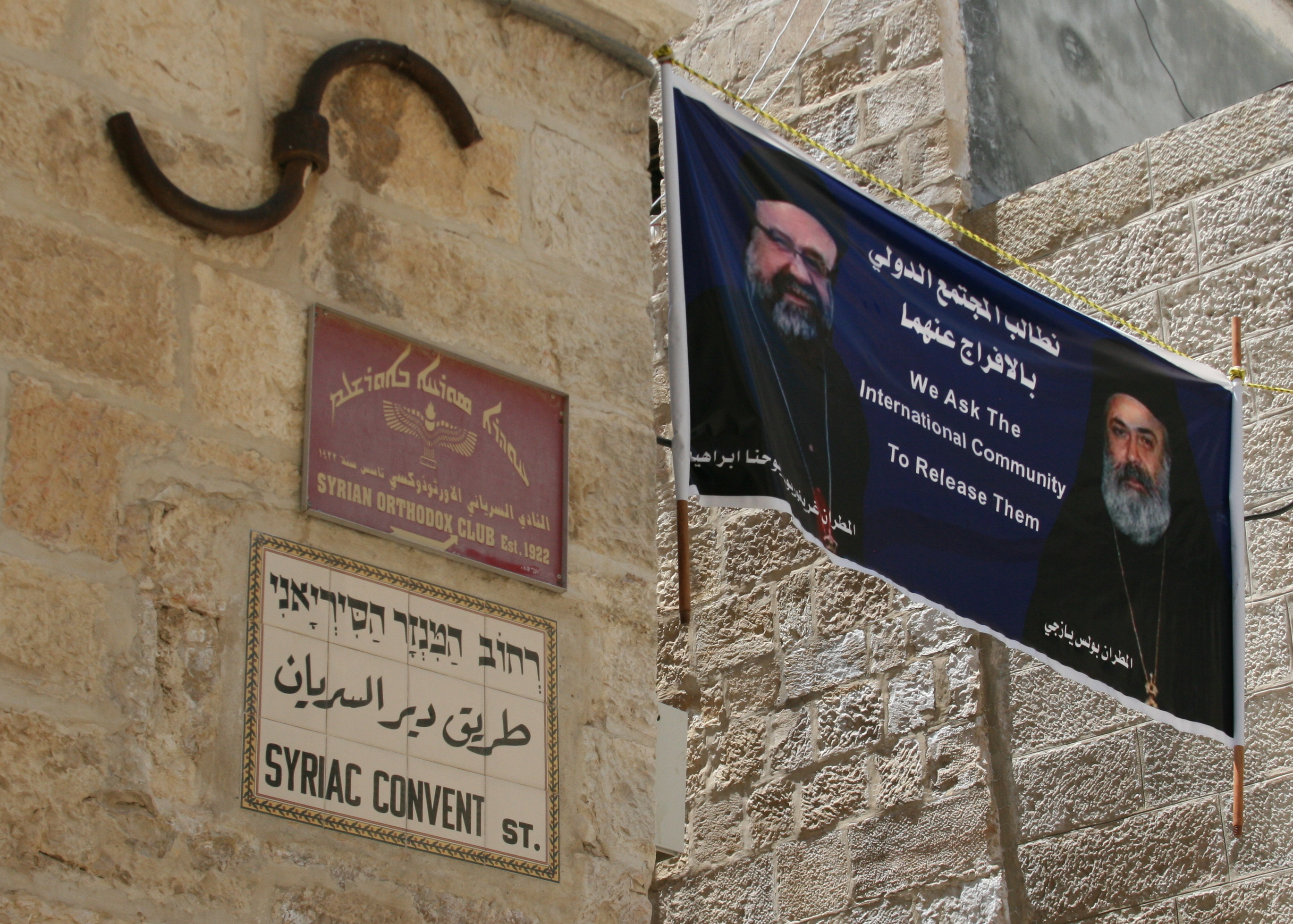
Banner in support of the kidnapped bishops in front of the Monastery of Saint Mark, Jerusalem, in 2013.

Ibrahim disappeared in 2013 while traveling with Boulos Yazigi to negotiate the release of two kidnapped priests, Fathers Michael Kayyal and Maher Mahfouz of the Armenian Catholic and Greek Orthodox churches, respectively. Paolo Dall'Oglio, an Italian Jesuit priest, went to Raqqa to secure their release, but he too was kidnapped. It is believed the kidnappers were Chechen from "Abu al Banat" jihadist group; Magomed Abdurakhmanov (aka Abu Banat) was imprisoned in Turkey in 2019 and appeared in a video that allegedly shows him beheading two men believed to be Syrian Christians. In March 2019, a Lebanese newspaper reported that Syrian democrats were negotiating for his release from ISIS. In April 2024, L'Orient-Today published a three-part investigation into the archbishops' disappearance, claiming that the Assad regime was responsible for their kidnapping, with Mor Yohanna Ibrahim as the primary target.

The Executive Director of the Assyrian Monitor for Human Rights and a relative of Archbishop Ibrahim, Jamil Diarbakerli, addressed inquiries regarding the missing church leaders in Syria. The archbishop was renowned for his courage and moral integrity, so when he learned about the kidnapped priests, he immediately took action; some speculate whether the abduction of the two priests served as "bait" for the larger kidnapping of Mor Yohanna Ibrahim. Perhaps Abu Banat's involvement was a strategic distraction orchestrated by the Assad regime and Turkish media to obscure the true identity of the perpetrators, as Abu Banat would likely have taken pride in the abduction, viewing it as an achievement. The world powers — the US, UN, and Russia — have shown much indifference toward the event, particularly given that Mor Ibrahim is a US citizen. The church hierarchy has also faced criticism for their perceived abandonment, as they focus on survival under both the old and new Syrian regimes.

The Middle East Council of Churches declared April 22 as "The Ecumenical Day for the Abducted and the Forcibly Absented" in honor of the abducted bishops John Ibrahim and Paul Yazigi, in a joint statement from the Syriac Orthodox and Greek Orthodox Patriarchates of Antioch.

== Works ==
- The Concept of Jurisdiction and Authority in the Syrian Orthodox Church on Antioch; tr. Rev. Fr. Monk Melki
- Emmanuel
- The Good Hope
- Lamb of God
- The Good Shepherd
- Life of Jesus
- Glory of the Syriac People
- Light and Giving
- The Syriac Antiochian Lighthouse
- Dolabani, the Ascetic of Mardin
- The Syriacs and the War of Icons
- Acceptance of the Other
- Companion of the Believer
- Diaries of Archbishop Mor Dionysius George Al-Qass Behnam

== See also ==
- Assyrian people
- Syriac Orthodox Church
- Paul Yazigi
- Sectarianism and minorities in the Syrian civil war
- Persecution of Christians by the Islamic State
- List of kidnappings

== Other websites ==
- M.G.Y.Abraham @Morgregorios on Twitter
- Friends of Mor Gregorios Yohanna Ibrahim on Facebook
- A complete list of John's works (in Arabic) at the Department of Syriac Studies
- Syrian Orthodox Archdiocese or Aleppo and Environs official website (Arabic language)
