= Assyrian International News Agency =

The Assyrian International News Agency is a privately funded, independent news agency which provides news and analysis on Assyrian and Assyrian-related issues. It was founded by Peter BetBasoo and Firas Jatou in 1995.

== Background ==
The website is registered to an address in Chicago, Illinois, belonging to Nineveh Software Corporation.

AINA articles have been cited by:

- The Wall Street Journal
- International Business Times
- The New York Times
- CNN
- USA Today
- Fox News
- The Christian Post
- Crosswalk.com
- United Press International
