= Ghazaleh =

Ghazaleh (Persian / Arabic: غزالة) may refer to:

- Ghazaleh (name), also Gazalé, Ghazalé, and Gazaleh
- Ghazaleh, Iran, a village in Khuzestan Province, Iran
- Beit Ghazaleh, a historic house in Aleppo, Syria
- Deir Ghazaleh, a village in the West Bank
- Khirbet Ghazaleh, a town in Syria
- Ghazaleh, a village in the Akkar District of Lebanon

== See also ==
- Ghazal (disambiguation)
- Ghazileh, Syria
