= Ghazaleh (name) =

Ghazaleh is both a given name and a surname.

Notable people with the surname include:

- Midhat J. Gazalé (1929–2009), Egyptian scientist
- Nawaf Ghazaleh (1927–2005), Syrian assassin
- Rustum Ghazaleh (1953–2015), Syrian military officer
- Al-Ghazali (1058-1111 CE), Persian theologian, jurist, philosopher, and mystic

Notable people with the given name include:

- Ghazaleh Alizadeh (1947–1996), Iranian poet and writer
- Ghazaleh Chalabi, Iranian protester killed by Islamic Republic regime
- Ghazaleh Golbakhsh, an Iranian-New Zealand filmmaker, actor and writer

== See also ==
- Beit Ghazaleh ('Ġazaleh House'), a palace from the Ottoman period in Aleppo
- Talal Abu-Ghazaleh (born 1938), Jordanian businessman
- Shadia Abu Ghazaleh (1949-1968), Palestinian activist
