= Zeinab Khatoon House =

- منزل زينب خاتون
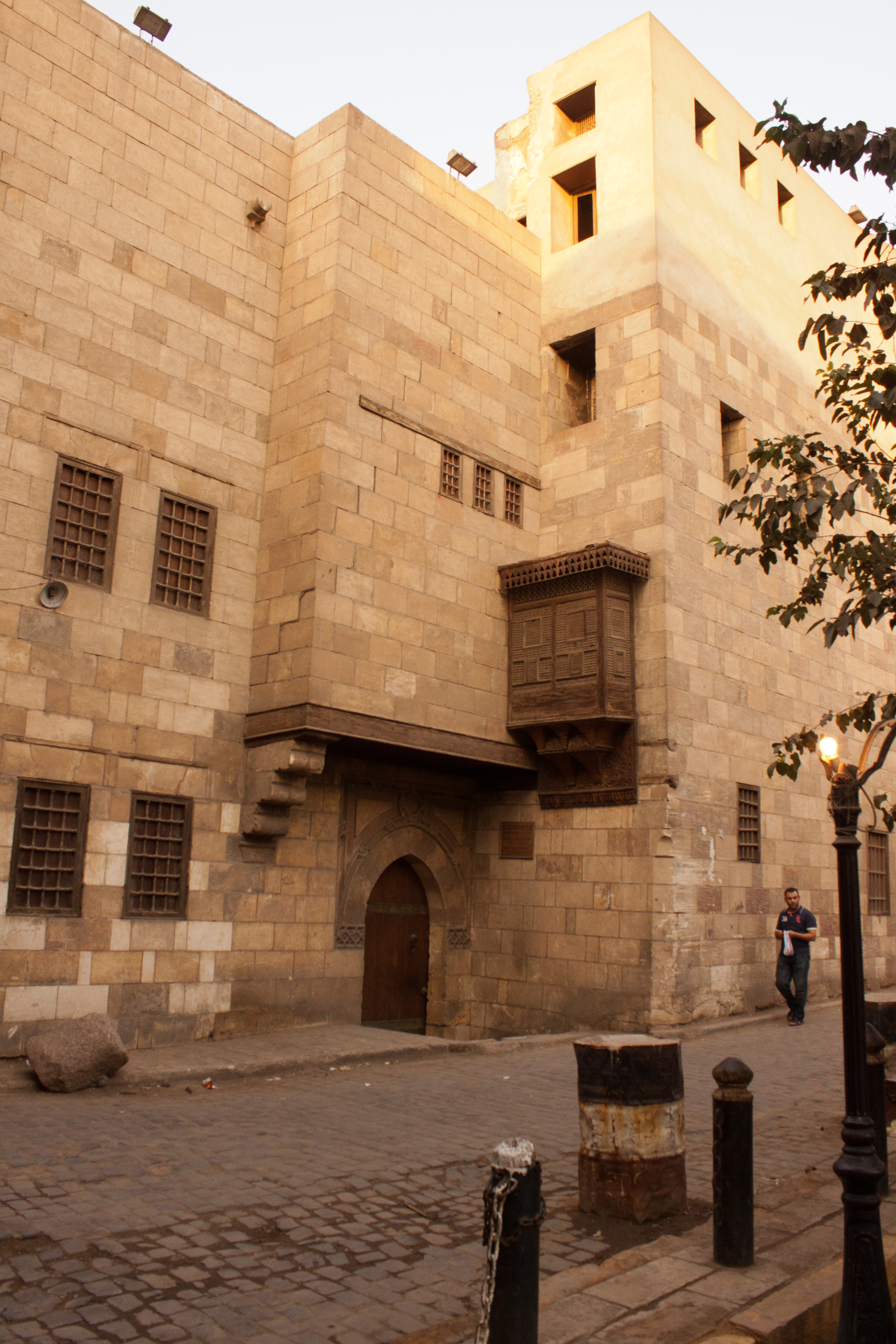
- The Entrance of Zeinab Khatoon House
- Interactive map of the Zeinab Khatoon House area

General information
- Architectural style: Medieval Cairo; Islamic architecture
- Location: Cairo, Egypt
- Coordinates: 30.0448°N 31.2636°E
- Construction started: 1486

Zeinab Khatoon House (in Arabic: منزل زينب خاتون) is a historical and archaeological landmark in Cairo. It is an old and famous house located behind Al-Azhar Mosque in Cairo. It is located in Atfet Al-Azhari, branching off from Sheikh Muhammad Abduh Street in the Al-Azhar district. It was founded in 873 AH/1486 AD by Princess Shaqraa Hanem, granddaughter of Sultan Al-Nasir Hassan Ibn Qalawun during the Mamluk era.

It is attributed to Zeinab Khatoon (means Lady Zeinab), the last person to reside there, who was the wife of Prince Sharif Hamza al-Kharbutli, who bought it for her and named it after her. The house is considered a model of Mamluk architecture.

== History ==
In 1486, Princess Shaqra Hanem, granddaughter of Sultan Al-Nasir Hassan Ibn Qalawun, one of the Mamluk sultans, built a beautiful house behind Al-Azhar Mosque. This house remained her property until 1517 and the entry of the Ottomans into Egypt. New arrivals succeeded one another in living in the house and added their touches to it.

The house was named after Zaynab Khatun, who was Zaynab bint Abdullah al-Bayda, a freed slave of Muhammad Bey al-Alfi. Al-Alfi Bey freed her, and she married a prince named Sharif Hamza al-Kharbutli. Because Zaynab married a prince, she became a princess like him, and the title Khatun, meaning noble and distinguished woman, was added to her name, so she became Zaynab Khatun. Her husband bought her the house of Shaqra Hanem, the granddaughter of Sultan al-Nasir Hasan ibn Qalawun, and the house was named after her, the house of Zaynab Khatun. She was the last person to live in this house before it was annexed to the Egyptian Ministry of Endowments.

This house had a history with the struggle. In 1798, the French campaign came to Egypt and the Egyptians' struggle against the French occupation began. Zeinab Khatoon participated in this struggle, sheltering the resistance fighters and the wounded who took refuge in the house when the French pursued them. Twenty-seven bodies were found in the house, buried in an underground cellar, believed to be the bodies of the wounded whom Zeinab Khatoon sheltered inside her house.

== Discovered Antiquities ==
In 1989, when the Egyptian Antiquities Authority renovated it, a treasure was found inside two pottery jars under the threshold of one of the rooms. The number of pieces discovered is 3,611 gold coins dating back to the fifteenth century AD, and more than 2,000 gold coins minted in Italy, Spain, Portugal and Hungary that were previously used in Egyptian markets. It is known as the “Zainab Khatun Treasure” and is currently preserved in the Museum of Islamic Art.

The most unusual discovery in Zeinab Khatun's house was a tomb near the entrance. This small chamber, used as a family burial ground, was devoid of any foundation and its walls were inscribed with prayers and verses from the Quran. It may have contained the remains of the resistance fighters. Zeinab Khatun's house also features a small room attached to her own on the third floor. Accessible only by a wooden staircase, this room served as the birthing room and is adorned with intricately crafted stained glass. To its left, a door leads to a raised platform called a "sandala," where the woman would stay after giving birth. Within the house's large, spacious halls are numerous wall cabinets inlaid with mother-of-pearl and ivory. In the center of the hall is a large, ornate marble basin called a "wasafa," used to hold earthenware water vessels to keep them cool. A decorative, openwork wooden lantern, adorned with stained glass, hangs from the hall's ceiling. The mashrabiyas are made of finely crafted wood, and there are also a number of large windows, some made of perforated plaster, and some decorated with stained glass. A curious feature of the house is the presence of several hiding places, including several bookcases that open in a special way to reveal a small room behind them. All the wood used was durable, expensive, and decorated with high-quality techniques.

== House Architecture ==
Zeinab Khatoon House is considered a model of Mamluk architecture and consists of a ground floor and two upper floors.

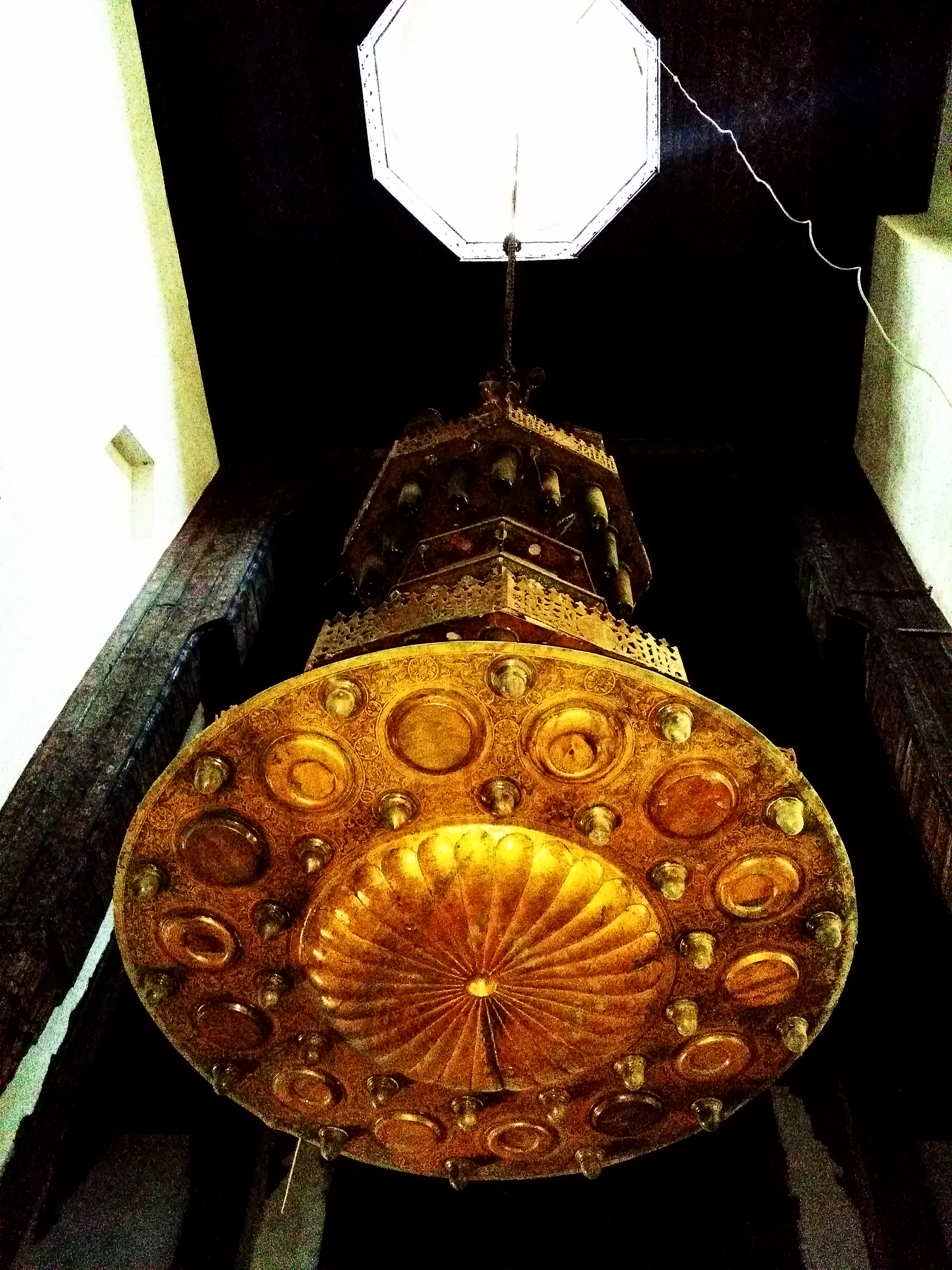
Zainab Khatoon house light

The house's entrance was designed so that guests could not see inside, a feature known in Islamic architecture as a "broken entrance." Upon entering the house, one finds oneself in a large courtyard surrounding the four corners, commonly referred to in Islamic architecture as the "sahn" (courtyard). The purpose of this design was to ensure that light and air reached the house's facades and its rooms. Zeinab Khatoon's house shares this characteristic with other houses in Fatimid Cairo, such as the Harawi House, built in 1486—the same year as Zeinab Khatoon's house and directly opposite it—and the Suhaymi House, built in 1648. This demonstrates that the courtyard was a fundamental feature of house architecture during the Mamluk and Ottoman periods.

There is also the princess's rooms: the birthing room on the third floor. This room is distinguished by its exquisitely crafted stained glass, which illuminates the room in different colors when sunlight falls upon it. On the left side of the room, there is a door leading to a "sandala," which contains a raised bed where the woman would stay after giving birth. After giving birth, the woman would ascend to the sandala and not leave the room for forty days. This was done for medical reasons, as the infant's immunity is weak during the first forty days. Therefore, the sandala served to isolate the fetus and mother from any factors that might harm either of them.

== The Restoration ==
In the early twentieth century, the Committee for the Preservation of Arab Monuments restored the house for the first time. The house was closed in 1981 after it suffered serious cracks until it was restored in 1989. It was then restored in 2025 by the Arab Contractors Company, which won the award for best project in the restoration projects category in the "Engineering News-Record Best Global Projects Awards" competition.

== As a tourist attraction ==
The house had been converted into a cafe and restaurant visited by tourists, and then the Egyptian Permanent Committee for Islamic and Coptic Antiquities took it over in 2011, as part of its rehabilitation to be the headquarters of the urban revitalization project for historic Cairo in cooperation with UNESCO.

The house has been transformed into a tourist attraction and is currently under the jurisdiction of the Egyptian Ministry of Tourism and Antiquities, registered under number 77. It is open to visitors throughout the day from 9 am to 5 pm.
