= Craig Hoyle =

New Zealand author and journalist

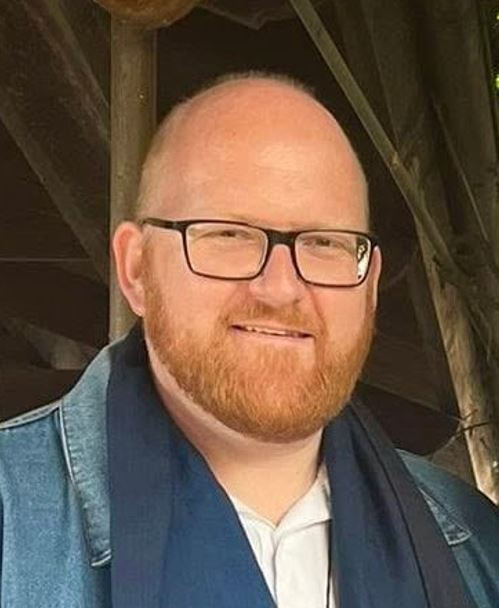
- Hoyle in 2025
- Born: May 1989 (age 37); New Zealand
- Occupations: Author, journalist
- Known for: Excommunicated (2023)

Craig Hoyle is a New Zealand author and journalist best known for his 2023 memoir Excommunicated: A Multigenerational Story of Leaving the Exclusive Brethren. He has served as chief news director of the Sunday Star-Times.

== Early life ==
Hoyle was raised in the Plymouth Brethren Christian Church (formerly known as the Exclusive Brethren). His memoir describes the church environment as highly structured and socially insular, and recounts the social and familial consequences faced by members who leave.

== Excommunication and advocacy ==
Hoyle was excommunicated as a young adult, resulting in estrangement from family members who remained within the church. He has stated publicly that prior to his departure he experienced church-directed efforts intended to suppress his sexuality, which he later characterised as a form of conversion practice.

His personal account was cited in media coverage surrounding New Zealand's Conversion Practices Prohibition Legislation Act 2022.

== Excommunicated ==
In 2023, Hoyle published Excommunicated: A Multigenerational Story of Leaving the Exclusive Brethren through HarperCollins New Zealand.

The memoir recounts his childhood within the Exclusive Brethren, the circumstances of his excommunication, the breakdown of family relationships that followed, and his efforts to rebuild his life outside the church. It also documents his family's seven-generation experience with the Exclusive Brethren across two centuries.

The book received coverage and reviews in Stuff, The Waikato Times, Pacific Journalism Review, and Woman's Day.

Hoyle discussed the memoir on Radio New Zealand, and on Newstalk ZB.

He has appeared at the Auckland Writers Festival, the Queenstown Writers Festival, Hamilton Book Month, Cambridge Family History Month, WOMAD, and the Decult conference.

== Journalism ==
Beyond his memoir, Hoyle has written as a senior journalist covering social issues, politics, and cultural topics. He reported from the Hong Kong pro-democracy protests of 2019.

His work has been published in The New York Times, Stuff, The Post, and the Sunday Star-Times.

He completed a 2014 dissertation titled Financially important yet voiceless: Representation of Asians in media coverage of the 2014 New Zealand General Election, available via Auckland University of Technology.

Hoyle is based in London, United Kingdom.
