= Qa'a (room) =

Reception room type

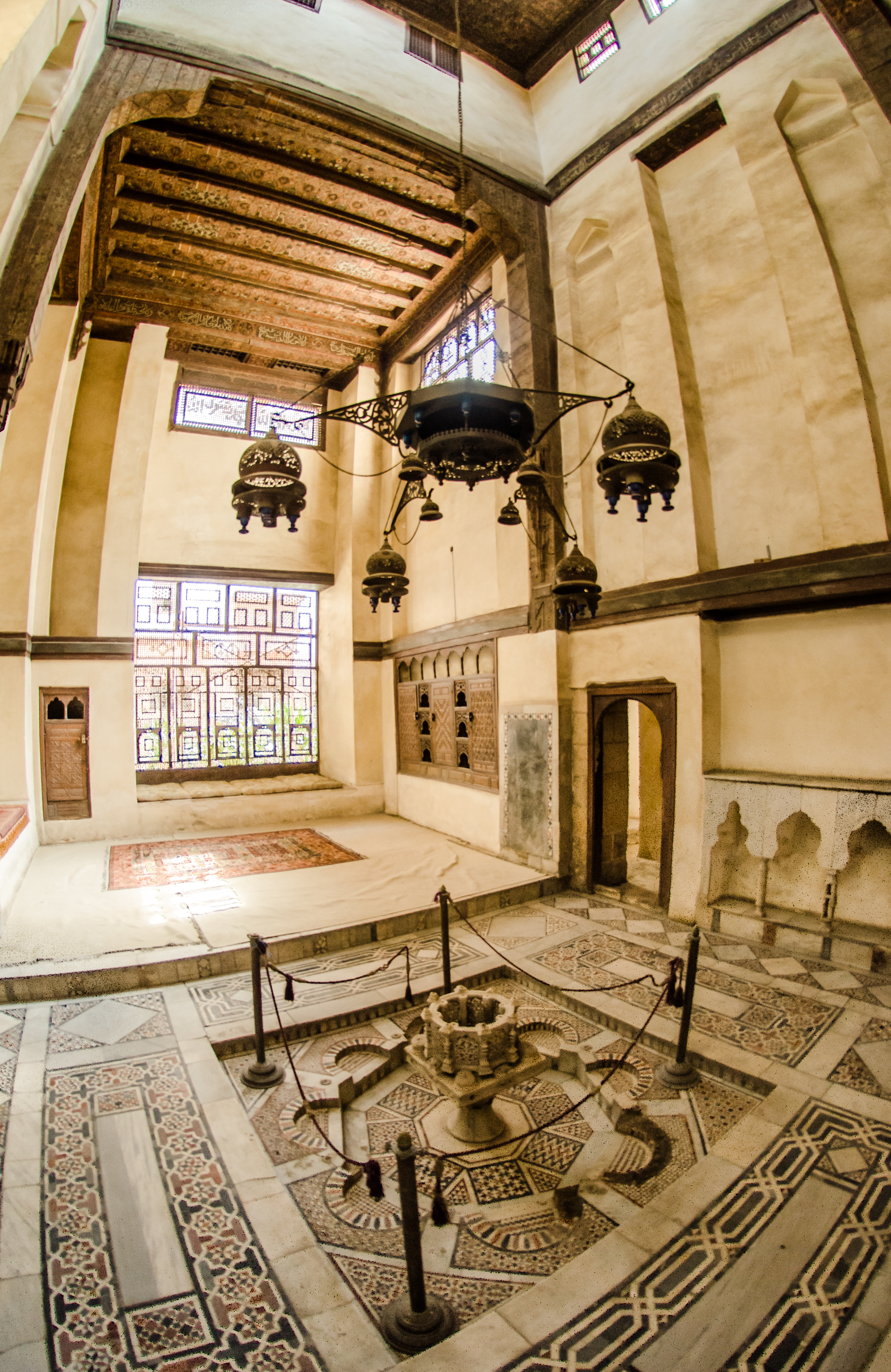
This qa'a in Bayt Al-Suhaymi Cairo is equipped with a cooling fountain and a lantern.

The qa'a (Arabic: قاعة, romanized: qāʿa) is a roofed reception room found in the domestic architecture of affluent residences of the Islamic world. It is the most common hall type in medieval Islamic domestic architecture. The plan of a qa'a may be inspired by the four-iwan plan (cruciform) of religious buildings. They were used to welcome male guests, where they would sit on the raised platforms.

Qa'as are typically found in the homes of wealthy individuals, such as merchants or local political figures. These rooms can be situated on the ground floor or the first floor of a residence and usually face the semi-private courtyard of the house. The qa'a combines elements of a courtyard and an iwan, consisting of a central area called the durqa'a and a raised sitting area known as the tazar. Guests would enter the durqa'a first, and then remove their footwear before being seated on the diwan in the tazar.

The durqa'a is the lower central area of the qa'a, where a cooling fountain, or fasqiya, might be installed to provide sound and refreshment. Flanked by two iwans on either side, the durqa'a serves as the central space for gatherings. The tazar, located in the iwan, is where male guests would be seated and served refreshments. Walls of the tazar often feature recessed shelves displaying decorative items and may include Arabic calligraphy, mashrabiyas, and decorative niches.

The qa'a is heavily decorated, often with vibrant colors and intricate patterns. Wooden panels made of cypress, poplar, or mulberry are common, sometimes layered with gypsum and adorned with metal leaf and paint. Floors are typically inlaid stone, and the ceiling heights vary between the durqa'a and the iwans. The design and decoration of the qa'a reflect the owner's status and serve to impress guests, making it a significant feature of Islamic domestic architecture.

== Description ==
A pair of traditional windcatchers (malqaf); wind is forced down on the windward side and leaves on the leeward side. In the center, a shuksheika (roof lantern vent), used to shade the qa'a below while allowing hot air rise out of it.

Qa'as are found in domestic houses of wealthy people, e.g. merchants or local political figures. They can be situated on the ground floor or on the first floor. Entrance to the qa'a is usually situated facing the semi-private courtyard of the house.

The qa'a can be described as a combination of a courtyard and iwan. The qa'a consists of a central area (durqa'a), where guests would first enter the qa'a via an opening; and the raised sitting area (tazar), where the guests would take off their footwear and be seated on the diwan, a couch that is placed on the floor against the wall. The tazar is placed in a kind of iwan, a rectangular hall walled on three sides. Normally there are two iwans facing each other on the main axis of the qa'a, with wall recesses on the two remaining sides.

The durqa'a (درﻗﺎﻋﺔ, durqāʿa, 'entry to the qa'a'), a lower central area, is the first area where the guests would enter into a qa'a via a main entrance. It is the central space of the qa'a. In a qa'a composition, the durqa'a is flanked with two tazars (raised sitting area) on the two sides of the durqa'a, or sometimes just one. The durqa'a is where a cooling fountain (fasqiya) may be installed, a typical feature in Islamic architecture which provides sound into the space.

The tazar is the raised sitting platform. They are located in the iwan. In the complete composition of the qa'a, there are two iwans flanking the durqa'a at the sides. The tazar is where the male guests would be seated, and then served food or coffee by the servants. In a few example, there is additional access that leads directly toward the tazar, usually this is a service access where the servants would enter to provide fruits or drinks. Recessed shelves are located on the wall on the sides of the tazar, this is where ceramic bowls, ewers, carved metal works, or books were displayed. The walls may also be decorated with Arabic calligraphy, usually of poetry, a dominant form of art in the Islamic world. Mashrabiyas are sometimes used to cover recesses on the side walls of the two iwans. Sometimes there's also a decorative niche (masab), which is treated like a kind of niche found in mosques, with miniature muqarnas decorating the miniature ceiling of the niche.

The ceiling of the iwan is always lower than the ceiling of the durqa'a. In the earliest qa'as, the iwans are usually barrel-vaulted (e.g. the qa'a of al-Dardir House in Cairo). In a Mamluk qa'a, one of the iwans would have a windcatcher (malqaf or badhahanj) which brings in the breeze into the qa'a. The ceiling of the durqa'a is normally the tallest in the qa'a, often topped with a wooden hexagonal skylight (shukhsheikha) which provides light into the interior or equipped with a lantern.

== Interior design ==
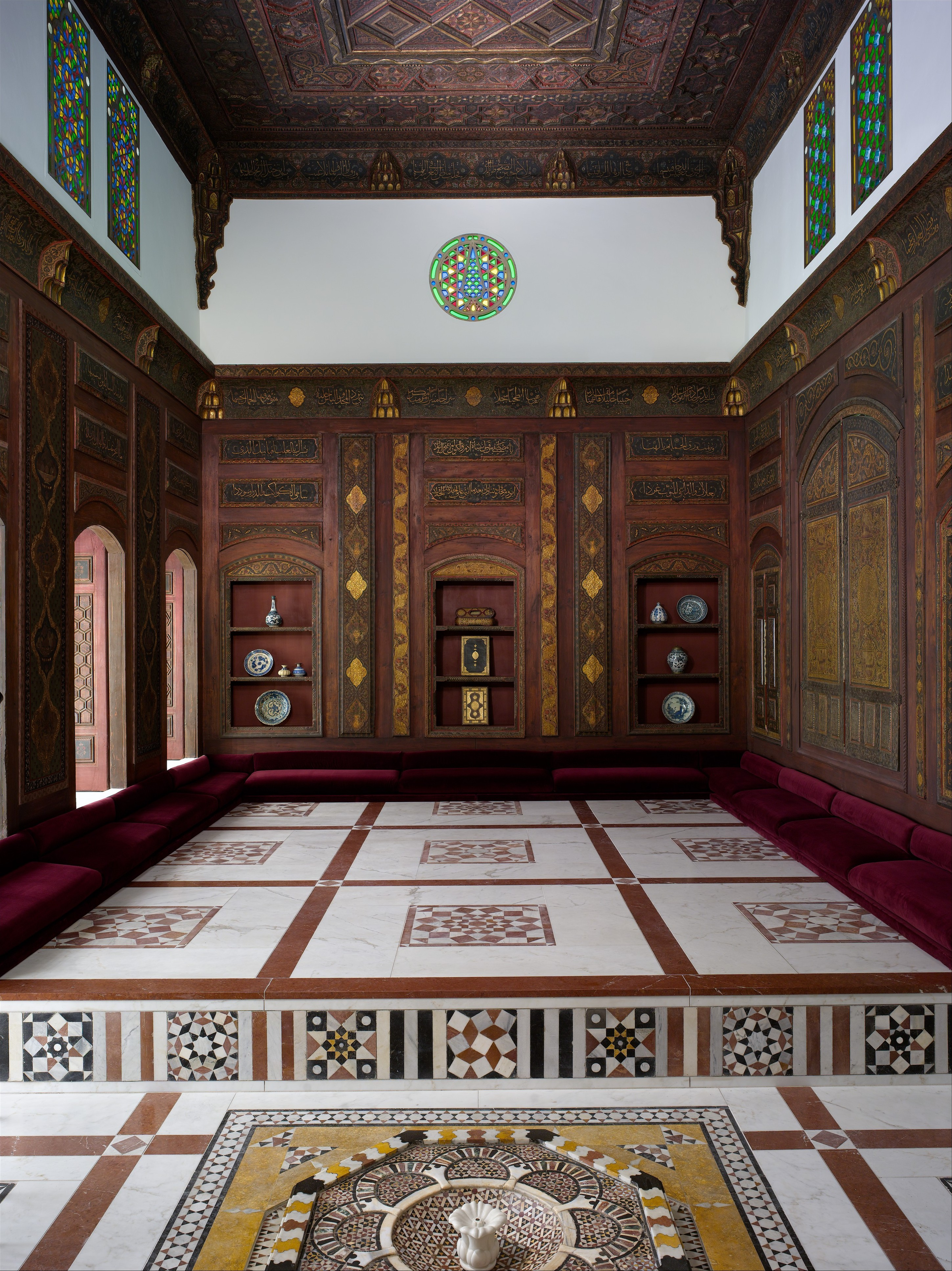
The tazar (sitting platform) of the Damascus Room, a qa'a from a medieval house in Damascus. This qa'a, designed in ajami-style, is now kept in the Metropolitan Museum of Art, New York.

The qa'a is heavily decorated with vibrant colors and complex pattern. The design of the room is where the owner of the house can show off to the guests. They can be designed in different styles, depending on where the qa'a is located.

The wall of the qa'a is normally wooden panels of cypress, poplar, or mulberry. A qa'a in Ajami style would have the wooden walls layered with a gypsum mixture to create a raised patterned surface, decorated with metal leaf (e.g. tin, silver, or gold) and then painted and layered. The entire wall would then be varnished. Today the color of old qa'a walls would be low in saturation, but they were used to be extremely vibrant in color. Many newer domestic houses, e.g. those in Damascus, still have vibrant colors of green, blue, fuchsias and purples.

The floor is of cut inlaid stones.

== Usage ==
The qa'a is one of many reception rooms featured in the domestic architecture found in Egyptian Ottoman and other Islamic worlds e.g. Syria. A qa'a is featured in affluent houses of a merchant or a local political figure. The place is where the owner of the house would have a meeting or greet his guests. The qa'a didn't have any fixed furniture as it is influenced by the seasons. The qa'a is ideally located to the north side of the courtyard of a house, so that it could have taken advantage of the sun's rays during winter when the sun would be at the lowest. If the qa'a is used for the summer, they would have the windcatcher to direct breeze into the room during summer time. The qa'a can also be used as a sleeping room. In that case, there will be a larger niche where bedding rolls and carpets would be placed to be used for sleeping.

ataba is a term to indicate a low zone, a term which is applied to the depressed durqa'a. If the guests of the house owner are not important, they are kept in the ataba. They are only allowed to enter into the tazar if they are guests of honor, where they would sit on the couches after taking off their footwears.

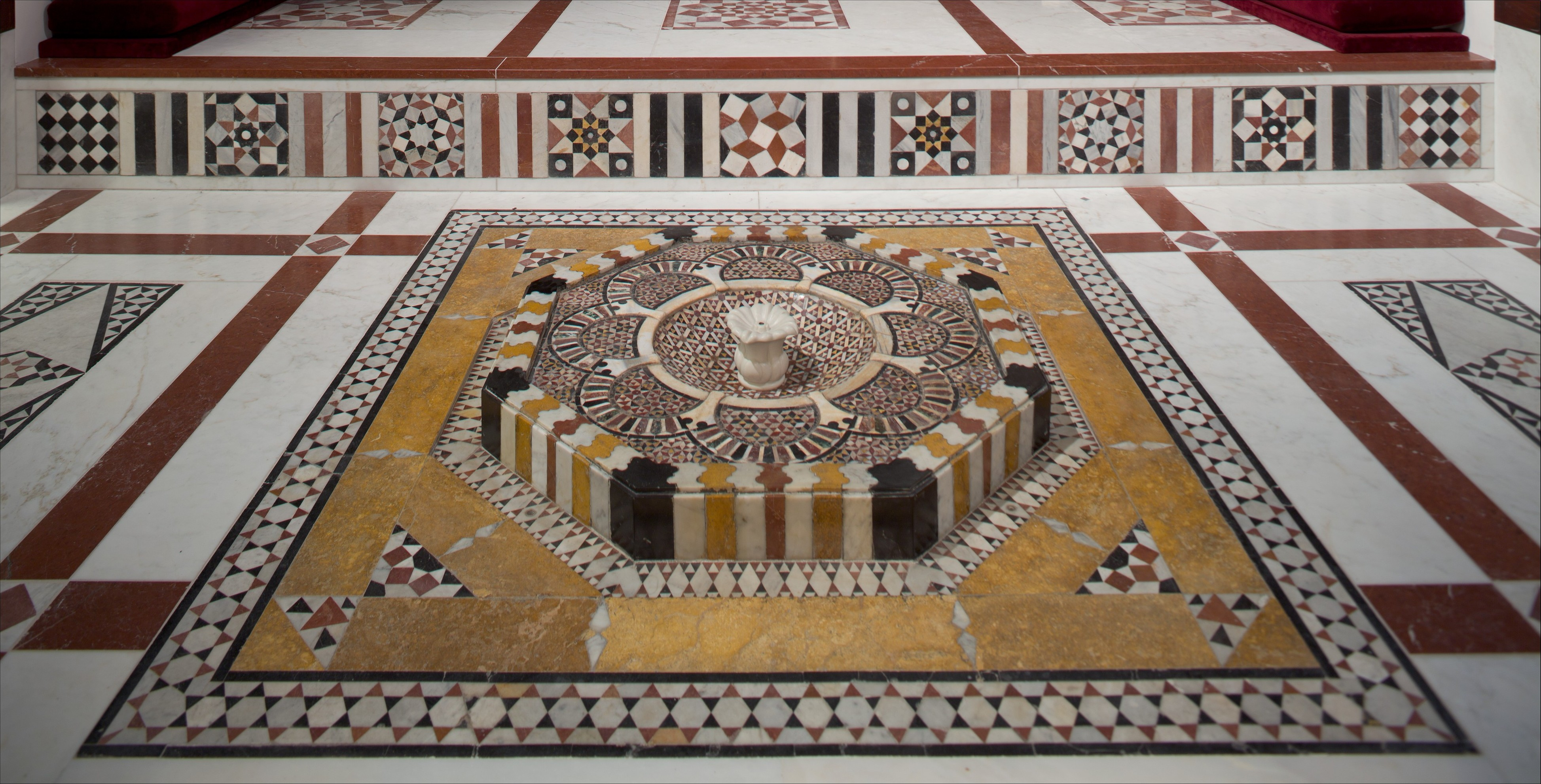
Fountain of the Damascus Room, it is on display at the Metropolitan Museum of Art, New York.

The tazar is a place where important guests would be seated. Here, they would be served fruits depending on the season, or drinks (e.g. coffee) or a hookah. Depending on how important the guests are, they would be seated toward the central part of the rear wall, where they could admire the glory of the qa'a.

== Examples of qa'a ==
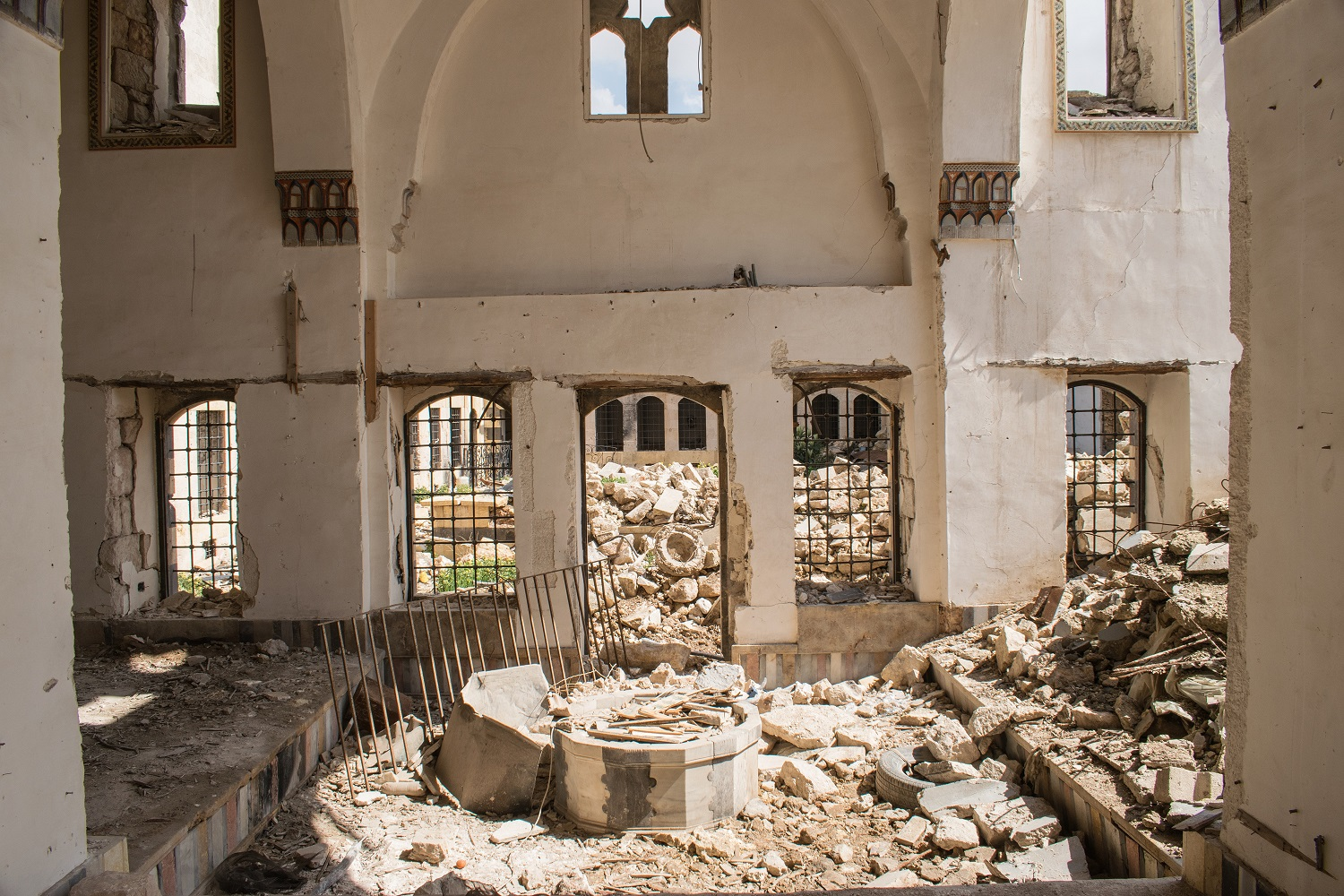
Damaged qa'a of the 17th-century Beit Ghazaleh in Aleppo. The fine woodwork of the room has been stripped out by looters.

The qa'a room is found throughout the Islamic world, especially in Ottoman Egypt and Ottoman Syria. Below are lists of buildings with notable qa'a:

- Egypt
  - Bayt Al-Suhaymi in Cairo contains many qa'as facing its inner courtyard.
  - The Grand Hall in the Convent of Saint George, just next to the Church of St. George (Cairo), contains a qa'a which was converted from an early 14th-century merchant's house. A 66-paneled double-door were installed in one of the arms of the qa'a, which leads to the chapel of the convent.
  - The qa'a of Muhibb al-Din al-Muwaqqi' is one of the best examples of domestic architecture from the Mamluk period. It is a 16 metres (52 ft) high room topped with an octagonal dome and equipped with an octagonal fountain. The room is decorated with calligraphic letters on its wooden panels and geometric stone tiles.
- Syria
  - The Damascus Room is an early 18th-century winter qa'a from a Damascus house. The interior of the qa'a is currently preserved in the Metropolitan Museum of Art in New York. The qa'a features stained-glass windows, a marble octagonal fountain in its durqa'a, and wooden panels decorated with Arabic inscriptions from a poem.
  - Bayt Ghazaleh in Aleppo contains a qa'a with three iwans with an octagonal basin in the center. The qa'a was decorated with painted wooden panels and stone tiles with geometric patterns. The 17th-century house, including its qa'a, has been looted and damaged by explosions from the armed conflict in Aleppo.
- England
  - The "Arab Room" at Leighton House Museum.

== See also ==
Media related to Qa'a (room) at Wikimedia Commons

- Cavaedium – a similar ancient Roman architectural space

== Cited works ==
- Duda, Dorothea (1971). "Innenarchitektur syrischer Stadthäuser des 16. bis 18. Jahrhunderts". www.perspectivia.net. FRANZ STEINER VERLAG. pp. 35, 90–1, 108. Archived from the original on 28 February 2018.
- Harris, Beth; Zucker, Steven (2013). "Qa'a: The Damascus room". Khan Academy. Khan Academ.
- Metropolitan Museum of Art (2012). The Metropolitan Museum of Art Guide. New Haven and London: Yale University Press. ISBN 9781588394552.
- Ragette, Friedrich (2003). Traditional Domestic Architecture of the Arab Region. Edition Axel Menges. ISBN 9783932565304.
- Williams, Caroline (2002). Islamic Monument in Cairo. Cairo: Cairo Press. ISBN 9789774246951.
