= Club d'Alep =

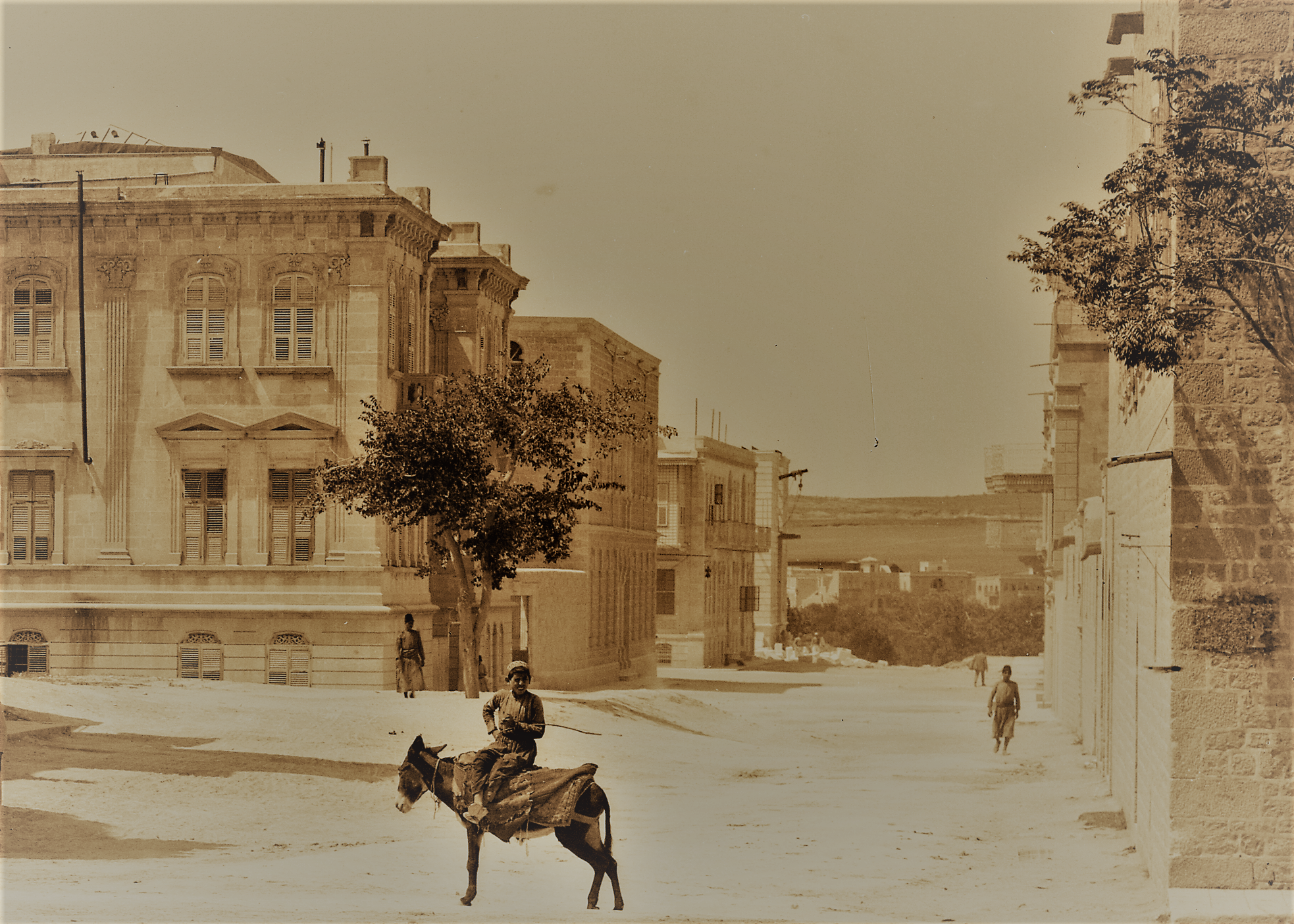
- The Club D'Alep was originally a residential mansion and was built in the late 1800s
- Formation: 25 June 1945; 81 years ago
- Type: Social Club
- Location: Qestaki Homsi Street, Al-Azizieh, Aleppo, Syria
- Coordinates: 36°12′31″N 37°09′3″E
- Members: 600

The Club d'Alep is a social club of Aleppo which was founded in 1945 and located in a former residential mansion in the city's Azizieh district. The club has been celebrated internationally for the quality and authenticity of its Aleppine cuisine.

== History ==
The Club d’Alep (Arabic: نادي حلب الشتوي) was founded in 1945 and has since served as a principle gathering point for the families of Aleppo's merchant class.

The Club is located in a late 1800s mansion built in the local composite architectural style. The building was one of earliest structures of the then newly developing Azizieh district of Aleppo. It first served as the residence of the Ghazaleh – a prominent Christian Aleppine family. It then became the location for the private club celebrated for the quality and authenticity of its cuisine, entertainment and nightlife.

The Club d'Alep, with its summer and winter branches, had been noted as having around 600 members. The character of the membership of the club changed somewhat after the economic upheavals of the late 1950 and early 1960s. Its reception hall was then used as a mosque during the 1970s. Traditional club activities have since been revived. Additionally, the front of the property has been expanded which has damaged the property's original architectural integrity.

== Sources and Further reading ==
- David, Jean-Claude (dir.); BOISSIÈRE, Thierry (dir.). Alep et ses territoires : Fabrique et politique d’une ville (1868–2011). Nouvelle édition [en ligne]. Beyrouth – Damas : Presses de l’Ifpo, 2014 (généré le 14 janvier 2017).
- Anissa Helou, My Syria: a journey through lost souks, spices and mulberry fields; A country now besieged was once a place of unimaginable culinary richness, Financial Tiimes, 9 October 2015
- Keith David Watenpaugh (2012) Being Modern in the Middle East:Revolution, Nationalism, Colonialism, and the Arab Middle Class, Princeton University Press, 352 pp
- Gabriel Ghazal (2014) Quartier Azizieh, Histoire et Palais, Al Jamaheer, 2014/06/09
- David, Jean-Claude et François Cristofoli (2019) Alep, la maison Ghazalé. Histoire et devenirs. Editions Parentheses, 176 p. ISBN 978-2-86364-323-5

== See also ==
- Aleppo
- Syrian cuisine
