= Auckland Writers Festival =

Annual literary festival in Auckland, New Zealand

Auckland Writers Festival Waituhi o Tāmaki
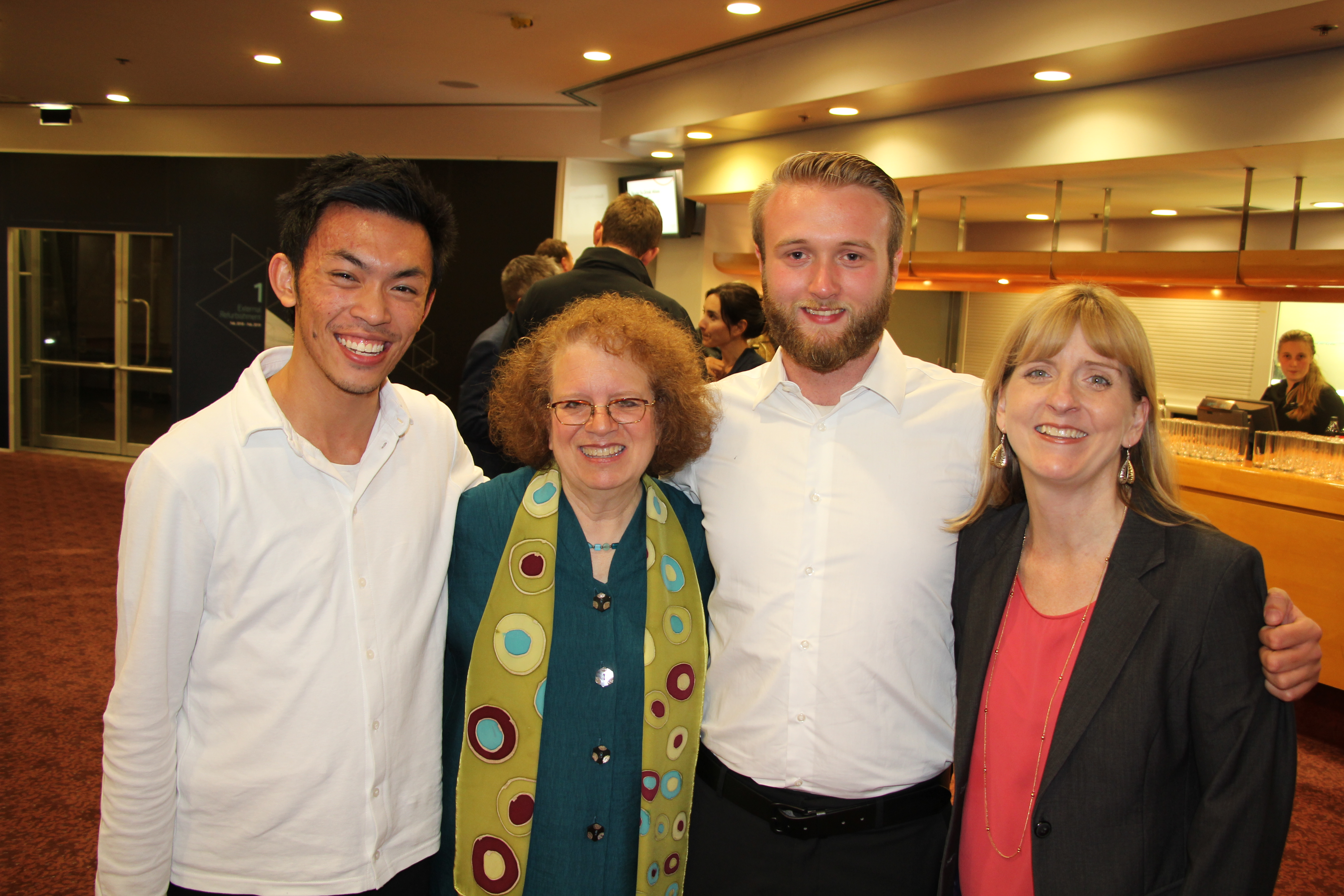
- Amy Goldstein at the Auckland Writers Festival in 2018
- Genre: Literary
- Dates: May
- Frequency: Annual
- Location: Auckland
- Country: New Zealand
- Established: 1999
- Founders: Stephanie Johnson and Peter Wells
- Organizer: Managing Director – Catriona Ferguson
- Website: https://www.writersfestival.co.nz/

Auckland Writers Festival Waituhi o Tāmaki is the largest annual literary festival in New Zealand since 1999. It has about 200 public events each year featuring local and international writers as guests.

== History ==
The inaugural festival was in May 1999. Founding trustees were writers Stephanie Johnson and the late Peter Wells (1950–2019). Since 2008 the festival has been a registered charitable trust under the name Auckland Writers & Readers Festival Charitable Trust. The trusts purpose is that it celebrates the work of writers, promotes literacy, a positive public profile for New Zealand writers, ideas and intellectual debate, literature which supports and reflects the partnership ideal of the Treaty of Waitangi, and encourages international understanding. By 2018 it was being described as the 'largest literary showcase in New Zealand'.

== 2018 Auckland Writers Festival ==
Over 75,000 people attended this festival. There were events featuring Jeff Tweedy, Kate Raworth, Antony Beevor, and John Boyne. Another part of the programme was The New 90, talking with writer Renee Hollis who interviewed 120 New Zealanders over 100 years old for Keepers of History. The Festival Gala Night – True Stories Told Live: Under Cover event gets writers in seven minutes to deliver a 'true story without scripts or props' in 2018 this featured people from England, Ireland, India, South Africa, the US, and New Zealand including Susie Boyt, Lisa Dwan, Gigi Fenster (South Africa/NZ), Alex Ross, Damon Salesa, Tom Scott, Shashi Tharoor, and Jenny Zhang.

in 2018 the Festival established the Mātātuhi Foundation, which provides grants to support and promote New Zealand writers and literacy.

== 2019 Auckland Writers Festival Waituhi o Tāmaki ==
The festival received a Māori language name in 2019, Waituhi o Tāmaki, the meaning relates to water wai, 'waiata meaning song-poem or reflecting water' and writing tuhi. Tāmaki Makaurau is the full Māori name for Auckland. The festival had a first-ever session in Māori language that featured Tīmoti Kāretu.

The dates for this festival were 13 to 19 May, and featured 230 writers. International writers included English Kamila Shamsie, American Andrew Sean Greer, and South African Sisonke Msimang.

Musicians appearing at the festival included Jeff Tweedy, from Wilco, Shayne Carter from Straitjacket Fits, mathematician and concert pianist Eugenia Cheng, English hip-hop artist, writer and poet Akala, the Auckland Philharmonia Orchestra, composer Kenneth Young, and tenor Simon O'Neill.

The Michael King Memorial Lecture at the Aotea Centre was delivered by Vincent O'Malley. The 2019 Honoured New Zealand Writer was Joy Cowley.

== 2020 Auckland Writers Festival Waituhi o Tāmaki ==
This event was cancelled due to COVID-19 restrictions in New Zealand.

== 2021 Auckland Writers Festival Waituhi o Tāmaki ==
International writers included Neil Gaiman and Behrouz Boochani in person, and Kazuo Ishiguro and artist Ai Weiwei streaming live. There was theatre, Blindness from London based on José Saramago's novel, and Witi’s Wāhine by Nancy Brunning based on the writing of Witi Ihimarea. Oro was curated by Ruby Solly and included Becky Manawatu, Ross Calman, Anahera Gildea, Arihia Latham, Nic Low, Kiri Piahana-Wong, and essa may ranapiri. Gina Cole curated Talanoa with Tusiata Avia, David Eggleton, Oscar Kightley, Selina Tusitala Marsh, Karlo Mila, and Victor Rodger.

Other writers included Isabel Allende, Marilynne Robinson, Yiyun Li, Mohamed Hassan, Sue Kedgley, Ngahuia te Awekotuku, Claudia Orange, Ghazaleh Golbakhsh, Brian Easton, Monique Fiso, and Charlotte Grimshaw.

A Clear Dawn was launched, co-edited by Paula Morris and Alison Wong this is the first-ever creative writing anthology of Asian New Zealand authors. Alice Te Punga Somerville presented the Michael King Memorial Lecture where she drew upon her book Two Hundred and Fifty Ways to Start an Essay about Captain Cook (2020).

There were workshops presented by Mary Karr, Carl Nixon, Kevin Barry, Eileen Merriman, Andrew O’Hagan, Michael Robotham, and Shaun Tan.

The closing event was called A Worship of Honoured Writers and featured Fiona Kidman, Patricia Grace, Witi Ihimaera, Vincent O'Sullivan, CK Stead, Brian Turner, and Albert Wendt. The programme was from May 11 to 16.
