= Midhat J. Gazalé =

Midhat Gazalé
- Born: 22 July 1929; Alexandria
- Died: 8 June 2009 (aged 79)
- Occupation: scientist

Midhat Gazalé (22 July 1929 – 8 June 2009) was an international telecommunications and space consultant and a visiting Professor of Telecommunications and Computer Management at the University of Paris IX. He served as President of AT&T-France, as chairman of the board for Sperry-France and for International Computers-France, and as an executive and research scientist for other major companies. He was made Chevalier dans l'Ordre national du Mérite in 1981. He was born in Alexandria and was a special advisor to the Egyptian prime minister for science and technology.

Gazalé was the author of the mathematics books Gnomon: From Pharaohs to Fractals and Number: From Ahmes to Cantor, both of which were published by Princeton University Press. The latter book won the 2000 Award for Best Professional/Scholarly Book in Mathematics and Statistics, Association of American Publishers and was one of Choice's Outstanding Academic Titles for 2000. An Italian edition was published by Dedalo Editore. He is also the author of Pyramids Road: An Egyptian Homecoming, published by the American University in Cairo Press.
