= Ghazaleh-ye Do =

Ghazaleh-ye Do غزاله دو
- Village
- Location within Iran
- Coordinates: 31°18′31″N 49°32′01″E
- Country: Iran
- Province: Khuzestan
- County: Ramhormoz
- Bakhsh: Central
- Rural District: Howmeh-ye Gharbi

Population (2006)
  - Total: 50
- Time zone: UTC+3:30 (IRST)
  - Summer (DST): UTC+4:30 (IRDT)

Ghazaleh-ye Do (Persian: غزاله دو, also Romanized as Ghazāleh-ye Do; also known as Ghazāleh) is a village in Howmeh-ye Gharbi Rural District, in the Central District of Ramhormoz County, Khuzestan Province, Iran. At the 2006 census, its population was 50, in 10 families.
