= Death of Ghazaleh Chalabi =

Death of a woman during 2022 protests in Iran

Ghazaleh Chalabi
- Native name: غزاله چلابی
- Location: Amol, Mazandaran, Iran

Ghazaleh Chalabi (Persian: غزاله چلابی; 1989 – September 21, 2022) was an Iranian mountaineer and athlete who was shot in the head and killed by the Islamic Revolutionary Guard in Amol.

== Background ==
Ghazaleh Chalabi was born in 1989 in Amol. She studied banking management and was an accountant for a private company.

== Death ==
Ghazaleh was shot by security forces while filming protests against the government of Iran on September 21, 2022. This video was widely spread on the Internet, social media, and news agencies.

== Preventing from donating her organs ==
‌Before her death, Ghazaleh had filled out the organ donation application twice and wanted her organs to be donated in case of brain death. Chalabi's family announced that they will donate her body parts, but the government of Iran did not allow her family to do so, and according to Ghazaleh's aunt, the security officers said, "This will make Ghazaleh a legend."

== See also ==
- Death of Hadis Najafi
- Death of Mahsa Amini
- Political repression in the Islamic Republic of Iran
