= Bayt al-Suhaymi =

Coordinates: 30°03′08″N 31°15′45″E

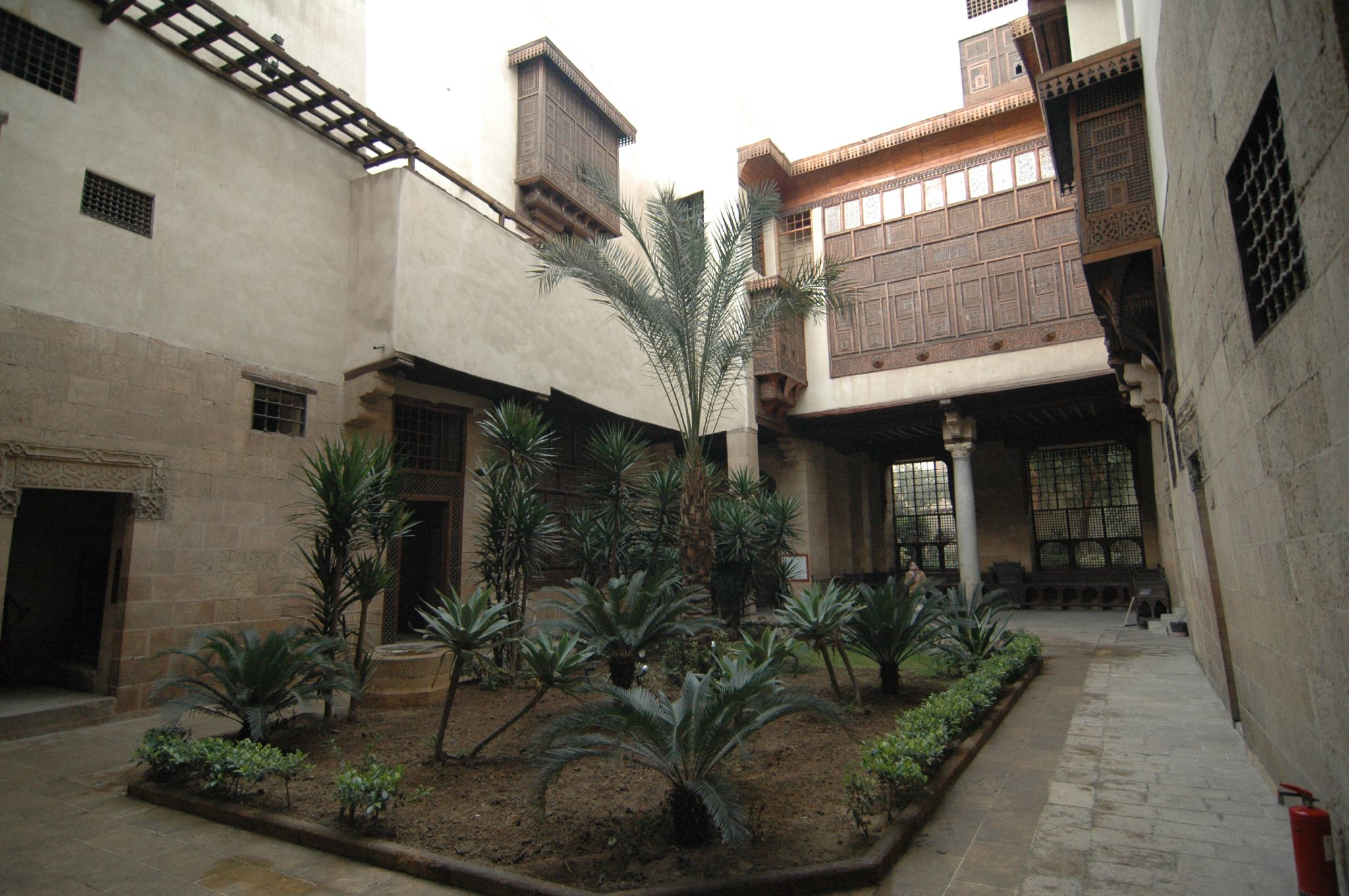
- Interactive map of the Bayt al-Suhaymi area

General information
- Architectural style: Medieval Cairo; Islamic architecture
- Location: Cairo, Egypt
- Construction started: 1648

Bayt al-Suhaymi (بيت السحيمي, "House of Suhaymi") is a traditional Egyptian Islamic themed house and museum in Cairo, Egypt.

== History ==
It was originally built in 1648 by Abdel Wahab el Tablawy along the Darb al-Asfar, a very prestigious and expensive part of Islamic Cairo. It was built in an Ottoman style, with separate floors for men and women. Haj Ismail ibn Ismail Shalaby later possessed the house and added the marine section. In 1796 it was purchased by Sheikh Ahmed as-Suhaymi, whose family held it for several subsequent generations. The Sheikh greatly extended the house from its original through incorporating neighbouring houses into its structure.

In 1931, the Suhaymi family sold the house to the Committee for the Preservation of Arab Antiquities.

== Present day ==
The house is built around a sahn, in the centre of which there is a small garden with plants and palm trees. From here several of the fine mashrabiya windows in the house can be seen. Much of the marble floor work, wooden furniture, and ceiling decor is still intact. In 1996, the building was restored with a grant from the Arab Fund for Economic Development, including the Mostafa Ga’afar, Sabil Qitas and Kharazaty houses which are in the same complex. Today the house is a museum featuring both the architecture and folklore.

== Images ==
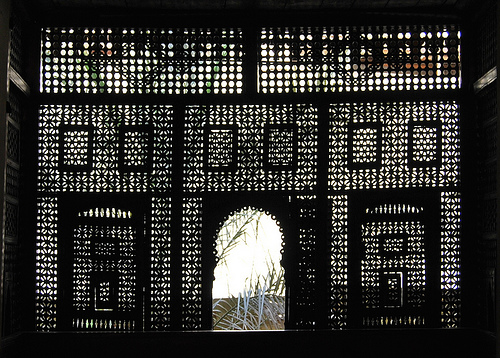
Old 17th-century Egyptian wealthy house in Old Cairo.

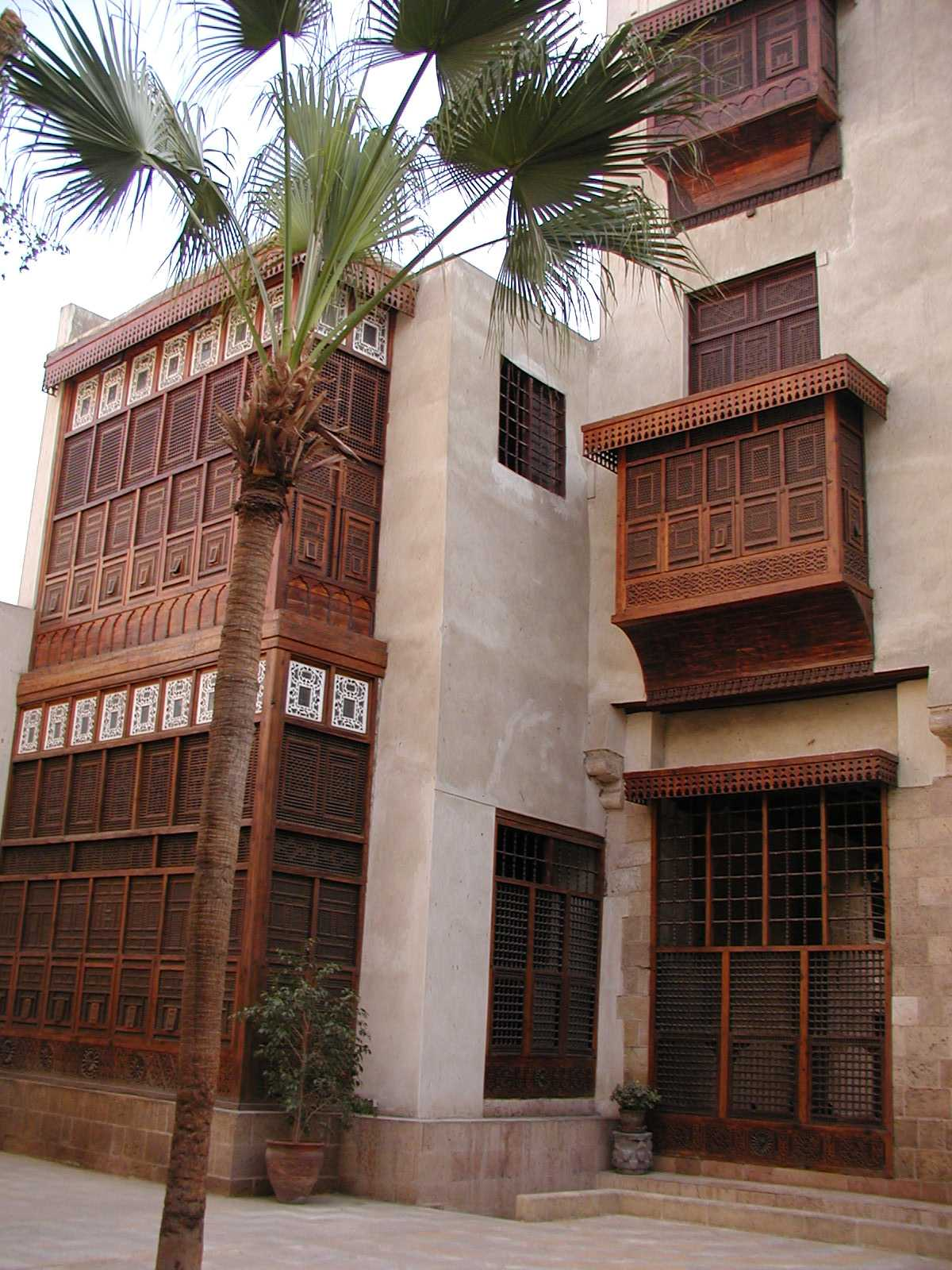

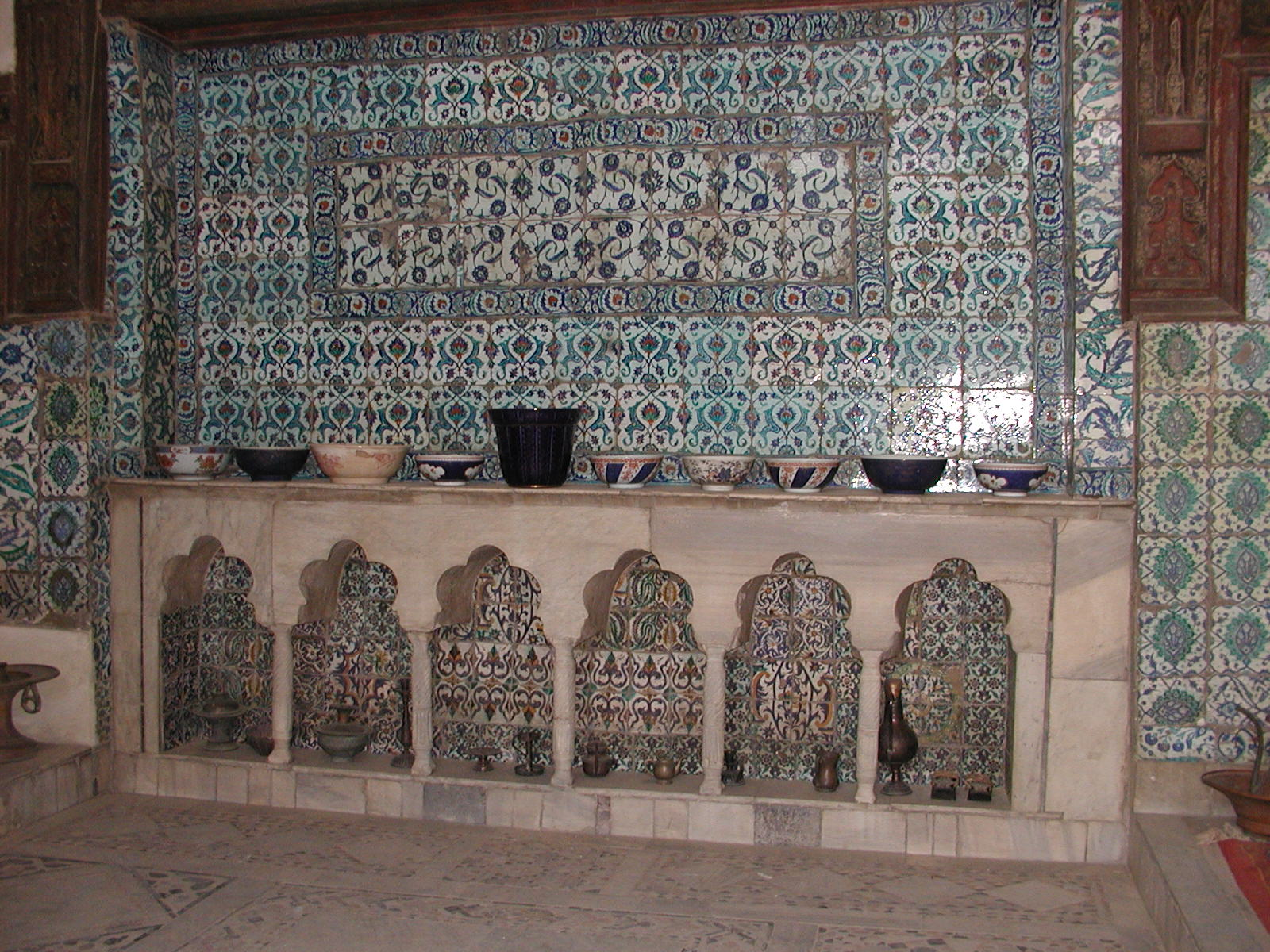

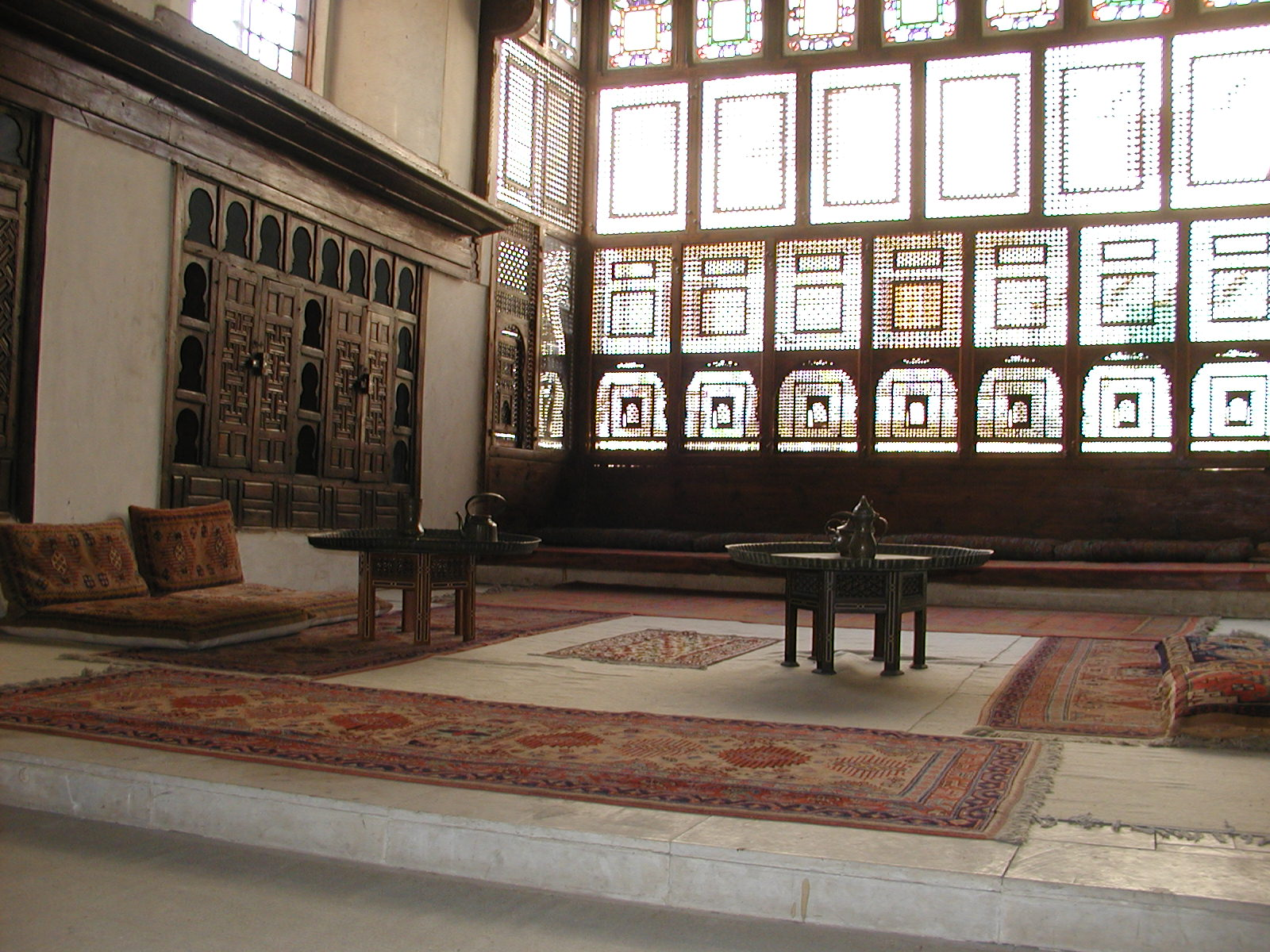

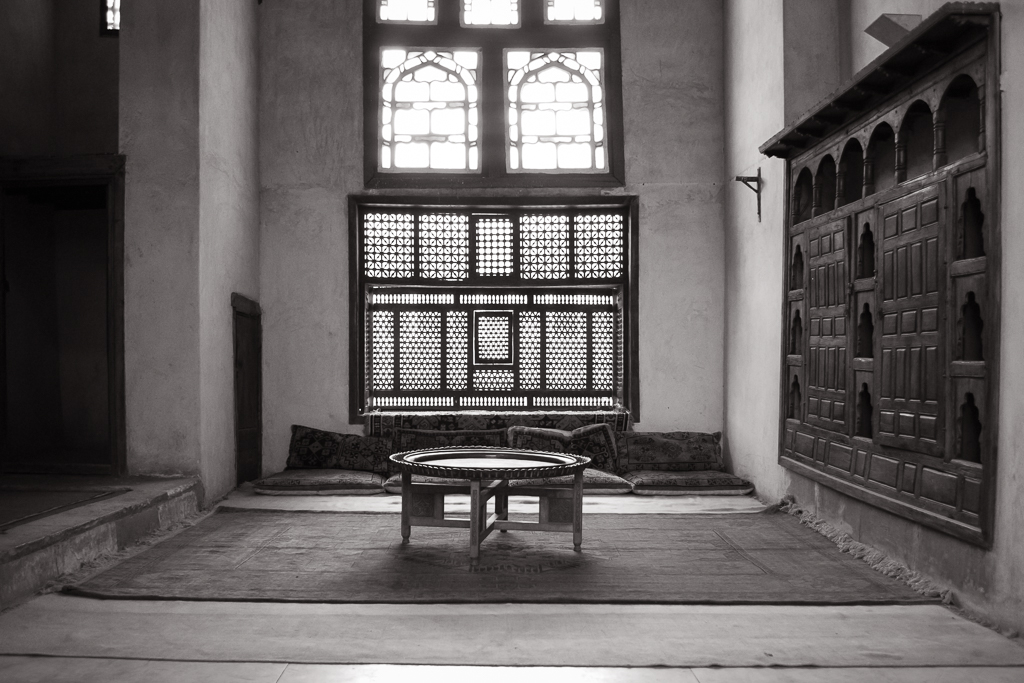
