= Ghazaleh Golbakhsh =

Iranian/NZ filmmaker, actor and writer

- Born: 1980 or 1981 (age 44–45); Tehran, Iran
- Other name: Ghazaleh Gol
- Education: University of Auckland (PhD, 2022)
- Occupations: Filmmaker; actor; writer
- Notable work: The Girl from Revolution Road (2020 essay collection)

Academic background
- Thesis: Monsters, Slackers, Lovers: Exploring Cultural Identity in Iranian Diasporic Cinema 2007-2017 (2021)
- Doctoral advisor: Stephen Turner; Shuchi Kothari
- Website: Official website

Ghazaleh Golbakhsh (born 1980/81) is an Iranian-New Zealand filmmaker, actor and writer. She has directed and written a number of short films and television shows, and written a book of personal essays. Her creative outputs draw from her experiences as an immigrant and her sense of identity.

== Life and career ==
=== Early life and education ===
Golbakhsh was born in Tehran, Iran and moved to Auckland, New Zealand with her family in 1987. She has said that her family's move was motivated by the 1979 revolution and the newly founded oppressive regime present in Iran. Golbakhsh and her family first lived in the Auckland suburb of Mount Wellington then later moved to Kohimarama and then Northcote. Golbakhsh noted that racist experiences as a new immigrant in school in New Zealand pushed her to practice her English reading and writing skills.

Golbakhsh completed a Masters of Screen Production, supervised by Annie Goldson, at the University of Auckland in 2012. For her thesis she made a 30-minute documentary titled Iran in Transit, which received the award for Outstanding International Student Film at the 12th Annual International Student Film and Video Festival in Beijing. In 2013 she received a Fulbright scholarship which enabled her to study screen writing in Los Angeles at the University of Southern California. In 2022 Golbakhsh graduated from the University of Auckland with a PhD by creative practice in Media and Communications which focused on Iranian diasporic cinema.

=== Books ===
Golbakhsh's first book, The Girl from Revolution Road (2020) is a collection of ten personal essays that depict her life, identity and immigrant experience. It was supported by a research grant she received from the New Zealand Society of Authors and Copyright Licensing NZ in 2019.

A review by New Zealand news website Stuff described The Girl from Revolution Road as a "powerful book", and a "collection of perceptive and engaging essays which focus on the immigrant experience and the curious doubling effect which occurs when two cultures overlap". Angelique Kasmara for the Aotearoa New Zealand Review of Books said the work "offers a fresh and vital perspective" and is an "excellent gift for every racist relative who won’t shut up". Steve Braunias for Newsroom listed it as one of the top 10 New Zealand non-fiction works in 2020, describing it as "pretty much the only really good book of non-fiction published in 2020" to examine issues of racism. Previously, in September 2020, Newsroom had run a week-long series focusing on the book, including reviews and interviews.

Golbakhsh contributed a chapter "Hyphenated Identity" to the anthology Ko Aotearoa Tātou: We Are New Zealand, edited by Michelle Elvy, Paula Morris and James Norcliffe. Her chapter dealt with themes of the immigrant experience in New Zealand and the concept of "home".

=== Screen ===
Golbakhsh wrote and directed the 2020 documentary web-series This is Us, about the lives of New Zealand Muslims. Golbakhsh herself is not a practising Muslim but views it as a part of her cultural identity. The purpose of the documentary series was to provide a positive and uplifting message following the 2019 Christchurch mosque shootings.

In 2022 she was one of eight women writers and directors who contributed to the anthology film Kāinga, each providing a 10-minute long short film set in the same house. Golbakhsh's section of the film was titled Parisa, about an Iranian woman wanting to return home to Iran. The film was screened at the 2022 New Zealand International Film Festival and Melbourne International Film Festival.

She is the director of Miles to Nowhere, a six-part comedy television series released in 2024 on Sky Open and Neon. The show is about the experiences of New Zealand's Muslim community. She has said she signed on to direct the show because she could see people she grew up with in the script, and appreciated that it was a comedy: "Normally stories that centre our community sit in the world of drama or tragedy".

Golbakhsh was the first Iranian actor to appear on New Zealand soap opera Shortland Street, playing detective Roshan Namal. She has also worked as a director on the show.

== Filmography ==
Year	Title	Involvement	Output	Ref
2024	Miles from Nowhere	Director	Six-part television series	
2022	Kāinga	Writer/Director 1/8	Feature film	
2020	This is Us	Writer/Director	Six part documentary series	
After 2020	Shortland Street	Director	Multiple television episodes	
2020–2021	Shortland Street	Guest actor playing Detective Roshan Namal	Multiple television episodes	
2019	The Waiting Room	Writer/Director	Short drama	
2017	Glimpse		Short documentary	
2015	Mandala	Screenplay	Short drama	
2012	Iran in Transit	MA Thesis	Short documentary	
