= Beit Ghazaleh =

Ottoman-era palace in Aleppo, Syria

Beit Ghazaleh بيت غزالة
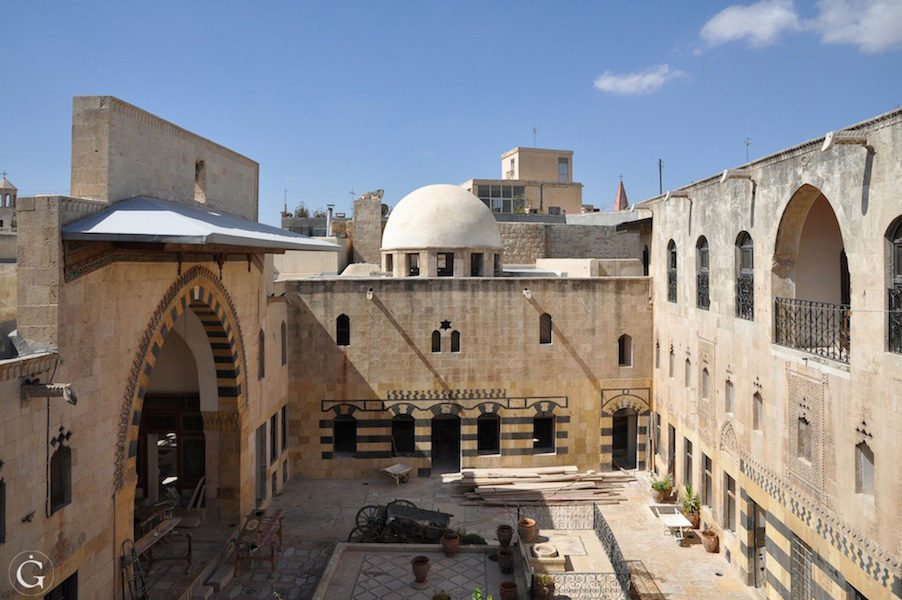
- The central courtyard of Beit Ghazaleh

- Location within Aleppo
- 36°12′24.4″N 37°09′23.1″E
- Location: Aleppo, Syria

History
- Built: 17th century

Site notes
- Area: Al-Jdayde, Aleppo
- Architectural style: Syrian-Ottoman
- Governing body: Directorate-General of Antiquities and Museums

Beit Ghazaleh (The Ġazaleh House; Arabic: بيت غزالة) is one of the largest and better-preserved palaces from the Ottoman period in Aleppo. It was named after the Ghazaleh family that owned it for about two centuries. Since 1914, it was used as a public school and restored to host the Memory Museum of the city of Aleppo. Beit Ghazaleh is located in the Al-Jdayde district of Aleppo. The structure has been damaged by warfare and earthquakes.

== History: the origins of the Ġazaleh House in Aleppo ==
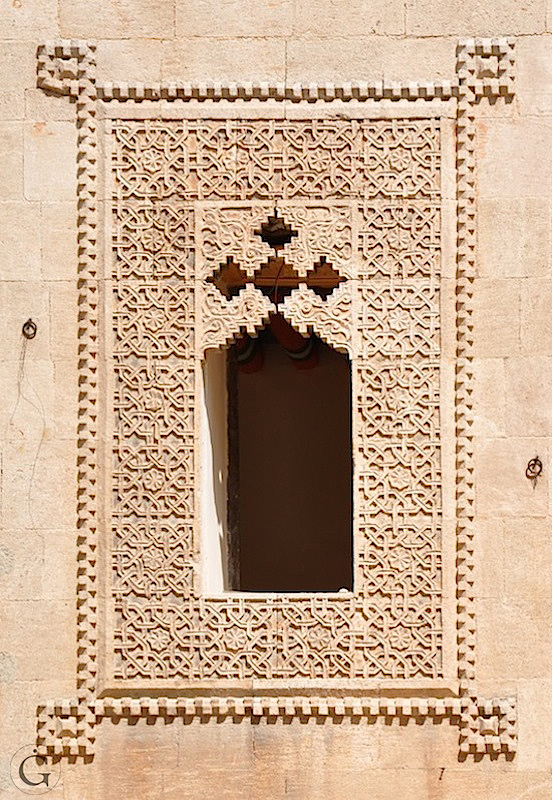
Example of the ornate windows of Beit Ghazaleh

The house is located on the Western edge of a large suburb inhabited by a multi-religious and multi-ethnic population. This neighbourhood to the North of the old city of Aleppo developed since the late Mameluke period. This area became the Christian quarter of Jdeideh which was organically clustered around its churches. Here lived the notables of Aleppo's Christian communities, notably the Armenians who specialised in trade with India and Persia.

The Ġazaleh House was built in front of two large Muslim waqfs — created in 1583-90 and 1653 — and together they form the monumental heart of a lively mixed Christian-Muslim neighbourhood. Unique for its size and decor, Beit Ghazaleh embodies the wealth and power of the Christian community in 17th century Aleppo. The decorative panels of Beit Ghazaleh do not include human figure representations; made by local craftsmen, the panels display many painted inscriptions presenting a mix of popular sayings, mystic poetry and biblical psalms. This diversity of sources underlines the rich Arab culture and the eclecticism typical of Aleppo urban élites.

== A palace built around many courtyards ==
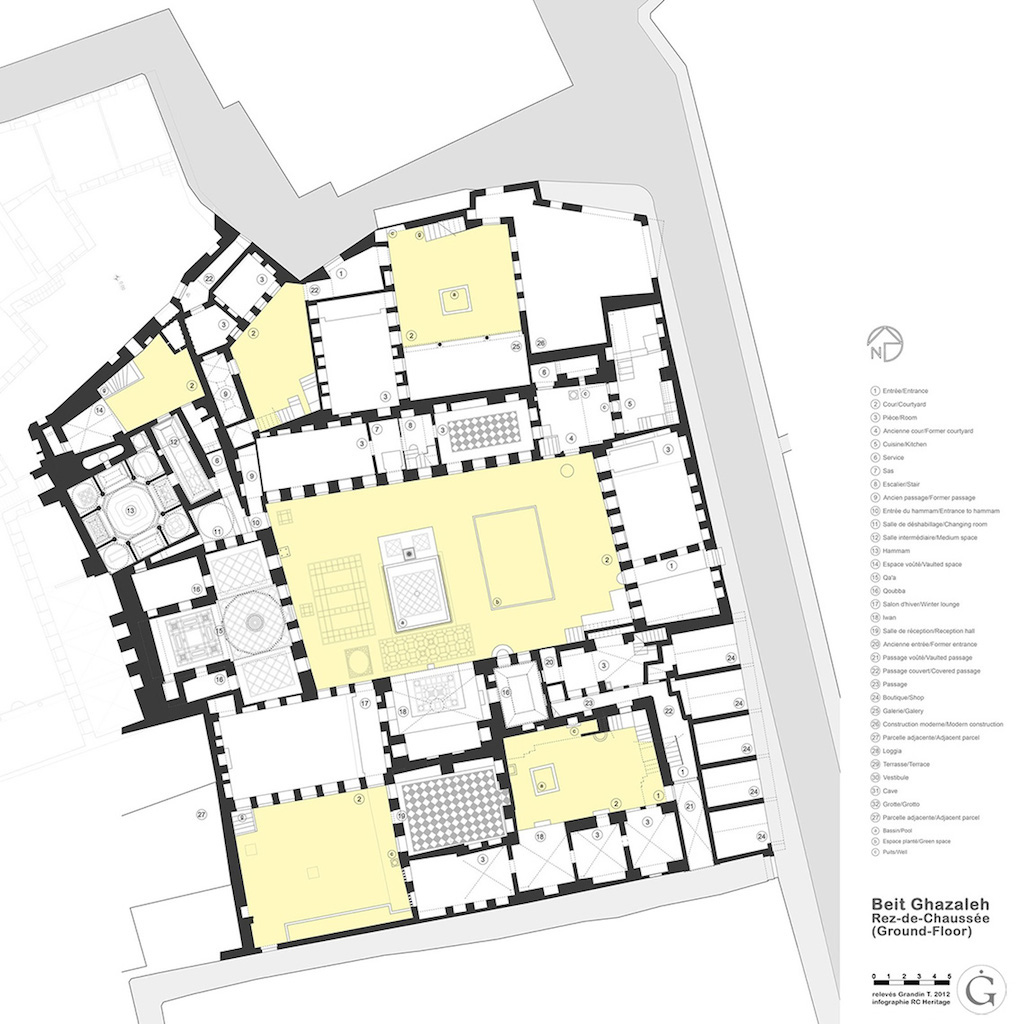
The six courtyards of Beit Ghazaleh (RC Heritage)

Throughout the centuries, the mansion's footprint expanded or contracted according to changing needs and fortunes. However, it always maintained a main central courtyard of 250m^{2}. At its apex, the house covered an area of approximately 1,600m^{2}, with 570m^{2} occupied by six courtyards. The actual size of the complex is practically invisible from the outside.

The present entrance was opened in the 19th century on the main street on the house’s East side. This entrance leads to the principal courtyard, the focal centre and the main thoroughfare to the rest of the house. Polychrome marble tiles, forming a "carpet" in front of the iwan, precede the great fountain in the courtyard, with its games of water, stone basins and cascades. The fine wall decorations in the courtyard are said to have been carved by the Armenian sculptor Khachadur Bali a member of the Balyan family of Ottoman court architects.

== The iwan ==
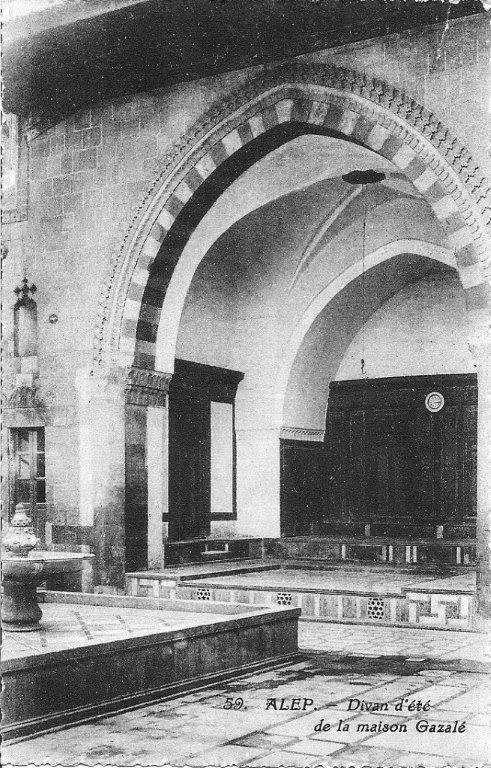
Ġazaleh House Iwan in Aleppo (Postcard 1918-1922)

A North-South axis cuts through the whole house underlining the importance of the iwan from where it originates. This line divides the courtyard's paving, basin and garden into a precise geometry. The rest of the space is organized according to the needs of the household and the shape of the plot without concern for symmetry.

All around the main courtyard, windows and doors punctuate the facades. Above these openings, the relative intricacy of the low relief decor surrounding them establishes the hierarchy of the rooms with the iwan at its summit. The stone decor of the iwan facade and of its annexes likely dates from the mid-17th century. The painted wooden panels of the qubba and the surviving panels of the iwan are likely dated from the same period. The iwan, first meant to provide comfort from the summer heat, is thus the "centre" of the house and plays an essential symbolic role representing the power of the master of Beit Ghazaleh.

== Rooms around the central courtyard ==
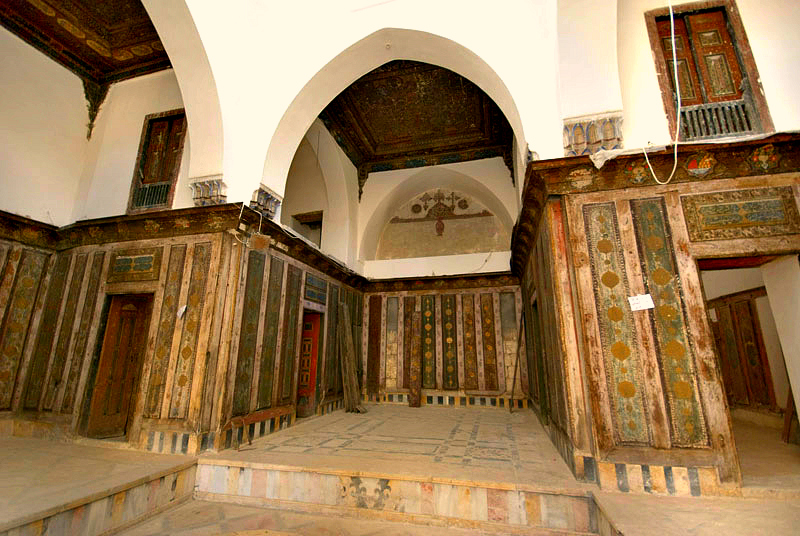
One of the interiors of the Ghazaleh House

The five rectangular rooms accessible from the courtyard were once decorated with woodwork that has now almost entirely disappeared. The sixth room to the West is a vast T-shaped qa'a, indicative of wealth and power.

== The North facade ==
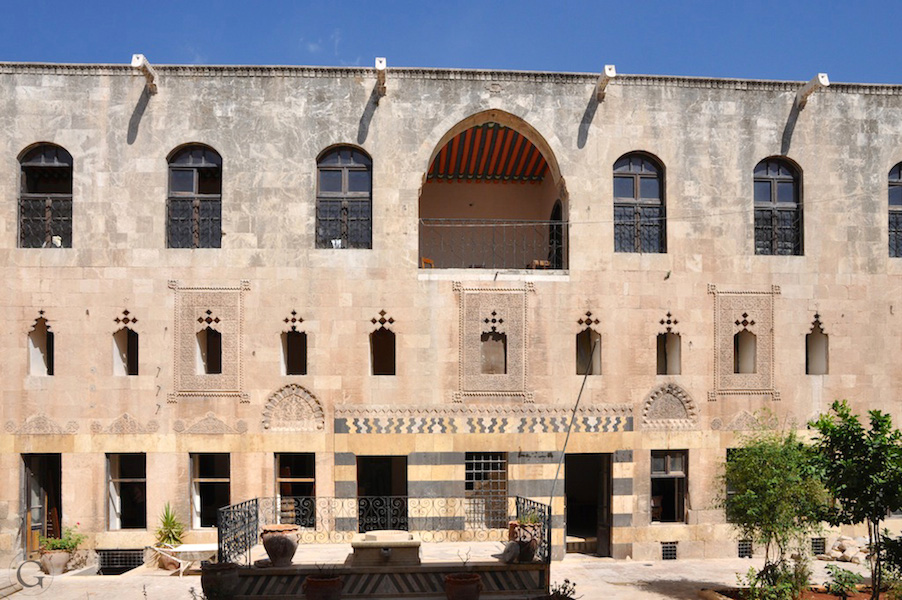
North facade of the Ġazaleh House

Opposite the iwan, the North façade dates from the end of the 17th century. It is remarkable for its lavish decor, unique in Aleppo. In the centre, the ablaq emphasizes the strict symmetry of the facade, while the interior spaces do not follow the same organization. According to an inscription, the large room in the East Wing dates from 1691. Its rich interior decoration, partially refurbished in the 19th century, includes four distinct sets of inscriptions:

- Psalm 91 of the Bible on the ceiling cornice;
- Popular sayings on the cornice of the wooden panelling;
- The fifteen transom panels above the openings reproduce a poem by Abû al-Fath al-Bustî addressing the themes of the condemnation of excess and unnecessary, reflections on human relationships, the need for God's help, and the need to be in control of one's body and improve one's heart and mind;
- The inscriptions above the niches on the North side reproduce the verses of al-Mutanabbi on honour, wisdom and ignorance.

== The floors ==
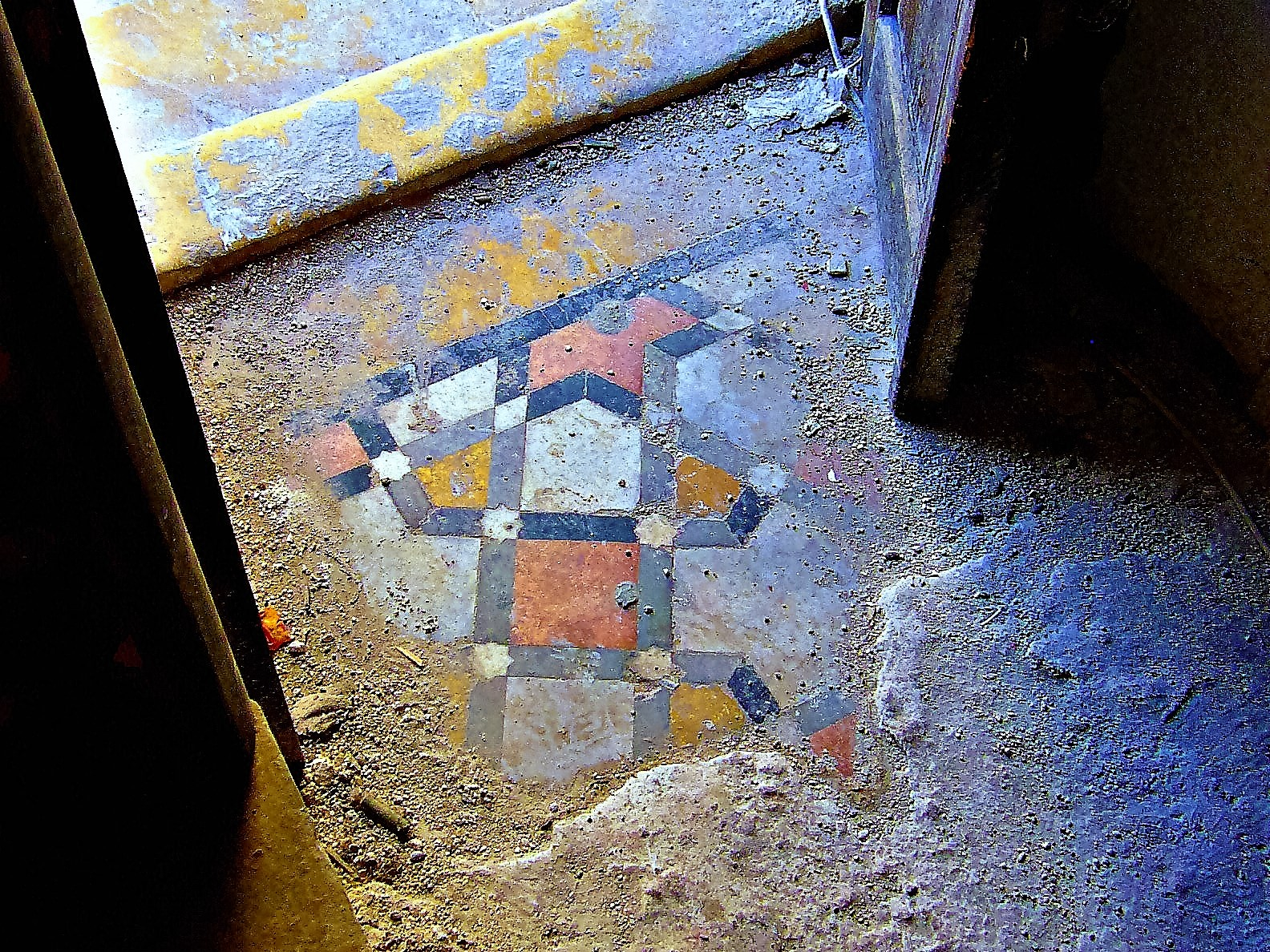
Ghazaleh House floors prior to renovation

The floor of the iwan, and of some other rooms, has retained its old split-level organization. The spaces where you stand and circulate, the corridors and the ataba-s, are roughly at the same level as the courtyard. The rest of each room, covered with mats and rugs, is about 50 centimetres higher. The line of sight and the height of cushions determine the height of the sills and windows and thus the internal and external organization of the facades.

== The hammam ==
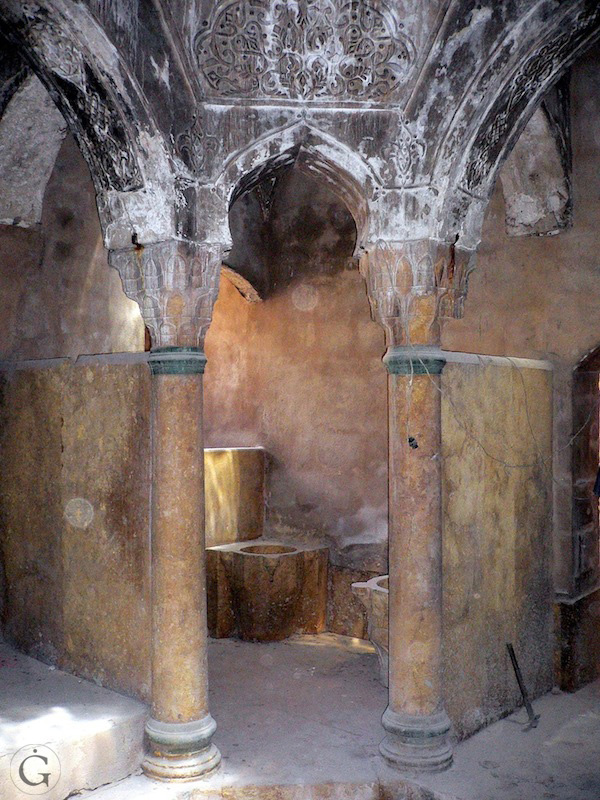
Ghazaleh House hammam interior

The hammam steam bath in the northwest corner is comparable to a public bath, but presents a simplified plan because the vast 'qâ‘a' served as a dressing room and resting space before and after bathing.

Kitchens and other service quarters, stables, granaries and warehouses for provisions were likely situated to the North-east and South of the house, accessible from the alleys that surround the plot to the house's North and the South.

== The West wing (the Qâ‘a) ==
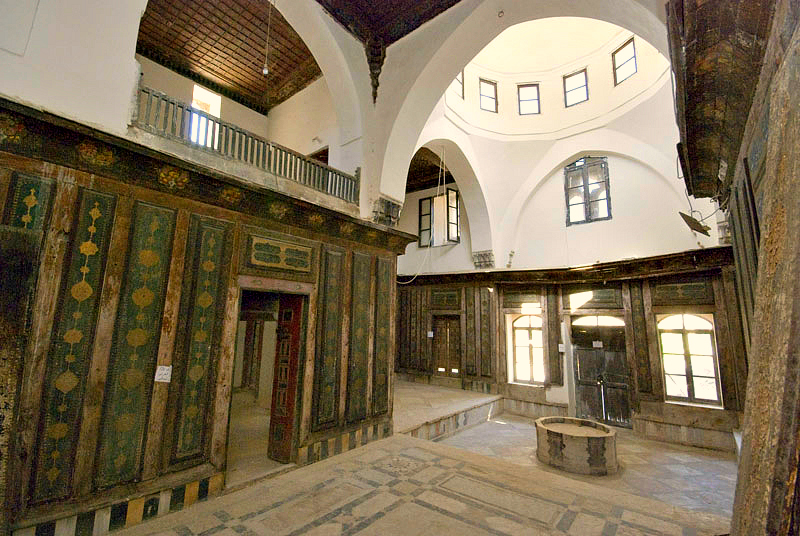
The grand qâ‘a of Beit Ghazaleh

The southwest corner of the courtyard, and the West wing, was completely rebuilt in 1737. It includes three key elements: a very large rectangular room with a fireplace, a large 'qâ‘a' and a hammam. The T-shaped 'qâ‘a' includes three iwan-s with wooden ceilings framing a ataba with a small octagonal basin in the centre, covered with a dome. The fourth facade of the ataba opens towards the central courtyard. Its interior decor includes stone tiles with geometric patterns and wooden panels painted with cups and fruit bouquets in vases.

The 'qâ‘a' has two sets of inscriptions. The poem calligraphy on transoms (in praise of the Master of the House) begins with a discourse on wine. It ends with a dedication and the name of Jirjis along with a date of 1737. Inscriptions on the ceilings offer praise to the Virgin and include a poem of love typical of Sufi mystic texts.

== The 19th century additions ==
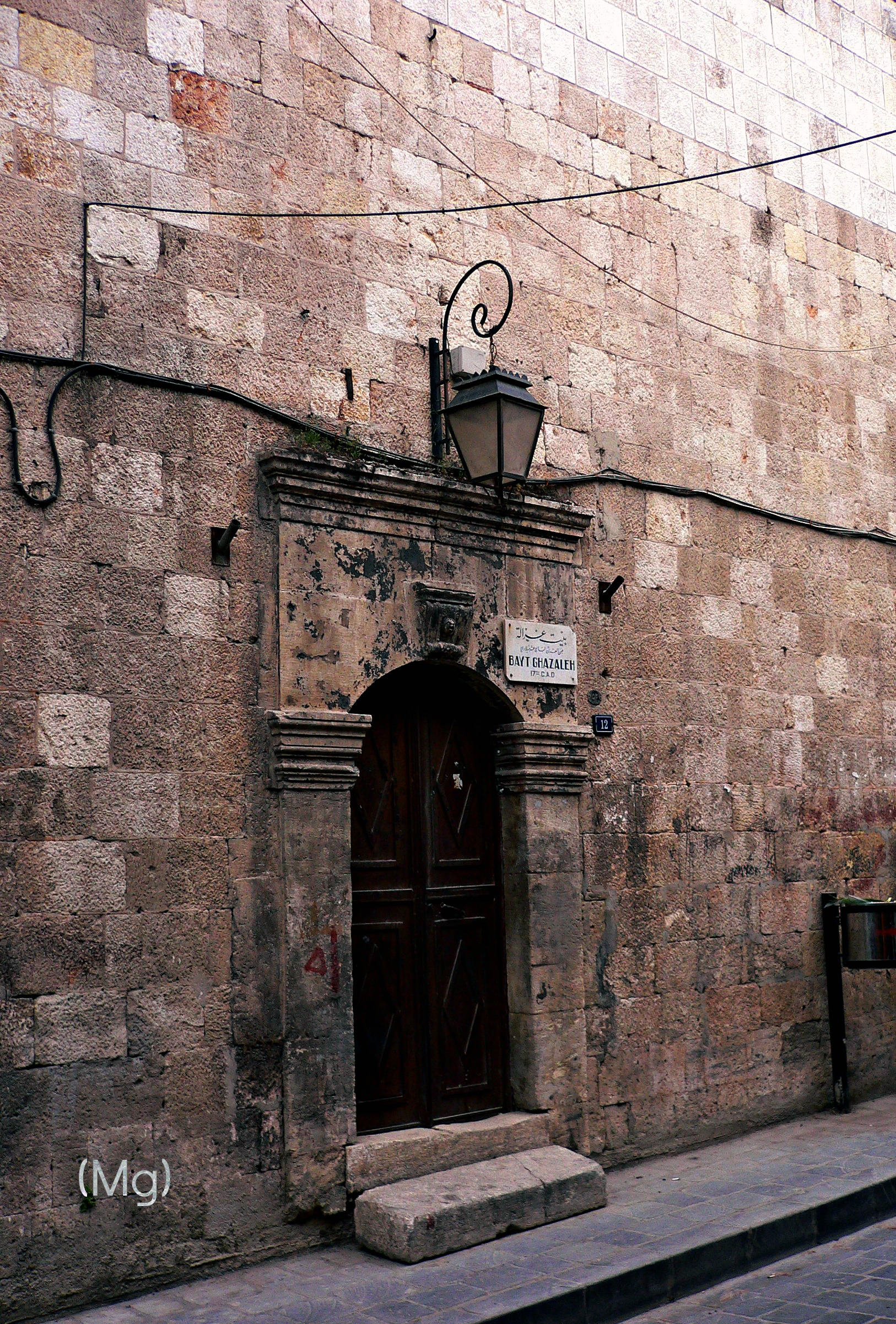
The main entrance to the Maison Ghazaleh

Significant changes were made to Beit Ghazaleh during the nineteenth century. Notably, rooms were added on the top of the North wing (dated 1880 by an inscription). A new Southern entrance to the impasse Chtammâ was built, dated 1304/1887. These major redevelopments were inspired by the appearance of consular apartments in the Aleppo urban caravanserais and by the architecture of embassies in the capital Istanbul.

== Loss, looting and destruction ==
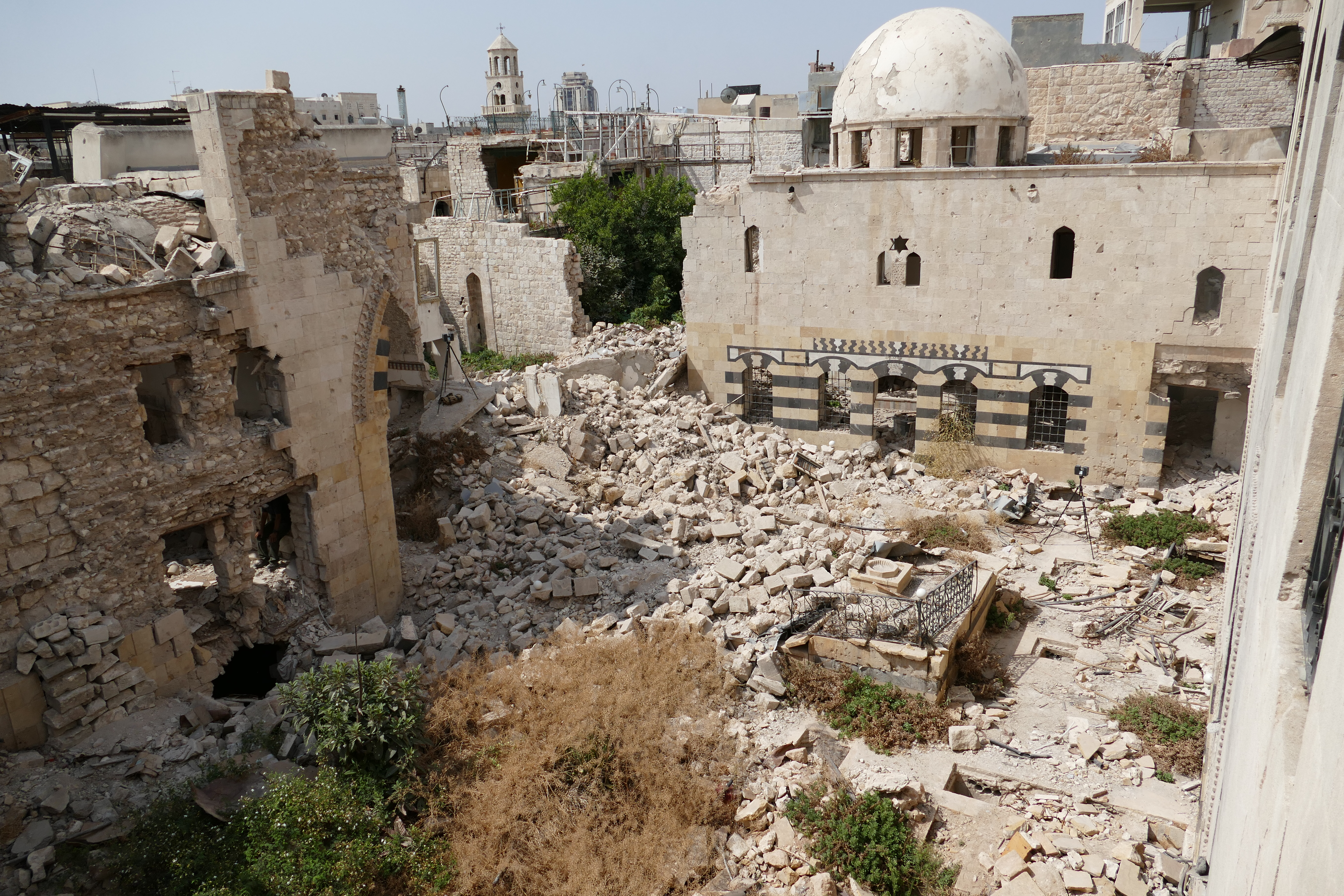
Beit Ghazaleh survey photograph of November 2017

During the nineteenth century, changes in the domestic lifestyle and the introduction of Western furniture ultimately led to aristocratic families abandoning houses such as Beit Ghazaleh. The transformation of the Ghazaleh House into a school was a factor for both its destruction and its preservation. While it allowed the preservation of the physical structure of the building, it also favoured the "disappearance" of many of its decorations.

Sections of the house's exceptional wooden decorative panels were still in place prior to the Syrian civil war. By the time of its restoration in 2011, a number of pieces had been lost, dismembered or sold to individuals or to museums.

Since then the Ghazaleh house, especially its iwan, suffered catastrophic damage during the Syrian civil war. The property was effected by various explosions from house-to-house combat. Prior to this, all the remaining wooden decorative panels, with the exception of a few ceilings, were looted.

A file regarding the looting of the decorative panels was submitted "to Interpol and the International Council of Museums in the hope that the panels resurface on the art market and can be returned" to the museum.

== Recent studies and restoration works ==
Video extract of high precision 3D laser scanner survey of Beit Ghazaleh of November 2017 (UNESCO, DGAM & AGP)

From 2007 to 2011, the Syrian Directorate-General of Antiquities and Museums (DGAM) conducted a major campaign of restoration to transform Beit Ghazaleh into a museum dedicated to the memory of the city of Aleppo. Restoration work notably concerned the renovation of part of the decorative panels by Damascene craftsmen.

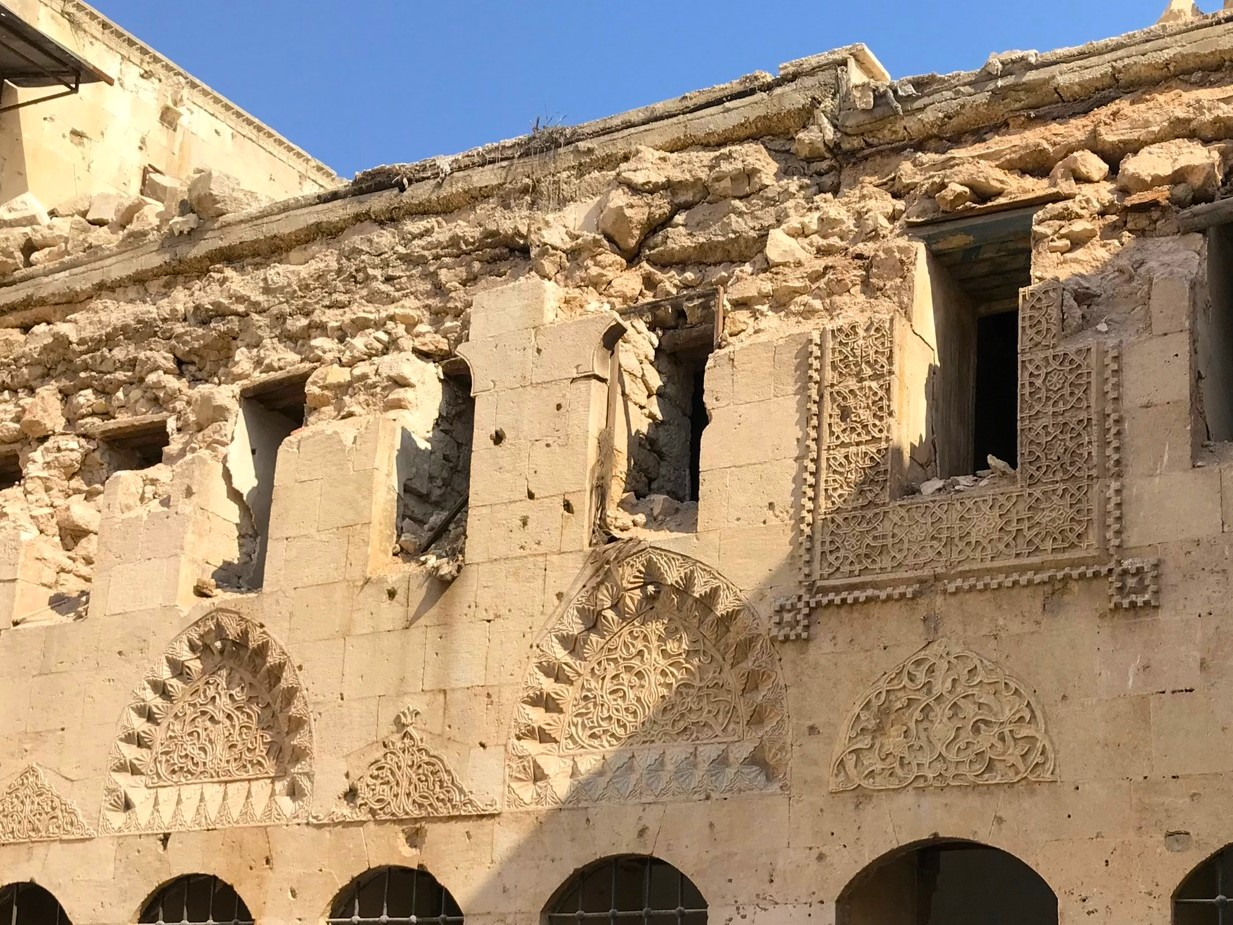
Subsequent earthquake damage seen on a courtyard facade of Beit Ghazaleh in early 2023

In parallel, descendants of the Ghazaleh family launched a scientific study of the House. This study, which began in 2009, includes a historical research on the neighbourhood and of the house, a stylistic analysis of its decorative elements, and a detailed architectural survey. The study aimed to establish a precise chronology of Beit Ghazaleh's evolution since its inception.

A collaborative high precision survey of Beit Ghazaleh was completed in November 2017 by the DGAM and UNESCO to facilitate the further study, protection and emergency consolidation of its structure. Further reports have been issued regarding damage to the property and looting of its decorative panels.

In January 2021 an application was submitted for Beit Ghazaleh to be added to the World Monuments Watch list. Emergency works to protect the structure were started later that year.

Beit Ghazaleh was further damaged during the region's earthquakes of February 2023. A number of remedial and restorative works have been undertaken since then.

== Sources and further reading ==
- Sauvaget, Jean (1941) Alep. essai sur le développement d'une grande ville syrienne, des origines au milieu du XIXe siècle. Paris, Librairie orientaliste Paul Geuthner, texte et album.
- David, Jean-Claude et François Cristofoli (2019) Alep, la maison Ghazalé. Histoire et devenirs. Editions Parentheses, 176 p. ISBN 978-2-86364-323-5 Electronic copies available from ARCHNET and from project website.
- David, Jean-Claude (2018) La guerre d’Alep 2012-2016. Destruction de la maison Ghazalé (1/2), ArchéOrient - Le Blog, 9 mars 2018; David, Jean-Claude (1982) Le waqf d'Ipchir Pacha à Alep (1063/1653), étude d'urbanisme historique. IFPO Damas, collection PIFD; David, Jean-Claude, The Battle of Aleppo (2012–2016): Destruction of the Ghazala House (Beit Ghazaleh), Syrian Heritage Archive of the Museum for Islamic Art/ Berlin State Museum, Undated
- Collectif 1989, (1989) L’habitat traditionnel dans les pays musulmans autour de la Méditerranée, I. L’héritage architectural: formes et fonctions, Le Caire, IFAO.
- RC Heritage (2011–15) Beit Ghazaleh (maison du XVIIè s.) à Alep [ Syrie ] étude historique et architecturale | historical and architectural analysis [working document]
- Publications mentioning the Ġazaleh House and family : David Jean-Claude, Degeorge Gérard (2009) Palais et demeures d'Orient - XVIe-XIXe siècle, Actes Sud / Imprimerie Nationale; Al-Homsi Fayez (1983) Old Aleppo, Damascus: Ministry of Culture and National Heritage Publishing, p. 127-128, Mansel Philip (2016) Aleppo Rise and Fall of Syria's Great Merchant City, IB Tauris, pp. 28–29, 44, 6pl; Masters, Bruce (1999) Aleppo: the Ottoman Empire's caravan city, in Edham, E., Goffman, D. and Masters, B., The Ottoman City between East and West: Aleppo, Izmir, and Istanbul. New York: Cambridge University Press, p. 58; Julia Gonnella (1996) Ein christlich-orientalisches Wohnhaus des 17. Jahrhunderts aus Aleppo (Syrien). Das 'Aleppo-Zimmer' im Museum für Islamische Kunst, Staatliche Museen zu Berlin - Preußischer Kulturbesitz. Mainz: P. von Zabern, p. 76; Hemeier, Birthe & Sabrine, Isber eds. (2021) Kulturraub - Fallbeispiele aus Syrien, Irak, Jemen, Ägypten und Libyen, Reimer Verlag, pp. 31–46; Dorothea Duda (1971) Innenarchitektur syrischer Stadthäuser des 16. bis 18. Jahrhunderts. Die Sammlung Henri Pharaon in Beirut (Beiruter Texte und Studien, 12) Wiesbaden (Steiner); Fedden, Robin (1956) Syria: a historical appreciation. London, Hale. p. 36; Samné, George (1928) Le Process Gazale : Correspondance d'Orient : revue économique, politique & littéraire / directeurs: Bibliothèque nationale de France (gallica.bnf.fr): [s.n.] pp. 241–5.
- Ghazaleh family connection to story telling with “Aladdin and the Magic Lamp”and “Ali Baba and the Forty Thieves”: Bottigheimer, Ruth. (2025). Hannā Diyāb (1688–1766): Early Life, French Fluency, and Storytelling. Asiatische Studien - Études Asiatiques. 79. 1-38. 10.1515/asia-2024-0016.
- Photographic archives: Aga Khan Trust for Culture and the Aga Khan Documentation Center at MIT, Bayt Ghazala; MIT Libraries, Ghazale House; Aga Khan Visual Archive, Ghazala House; Photographs from Brandhorst & Bremer, 2001.
- Since 2011 numerous initiatives have been launched to protect Aleppo's unique heritage. Those that specifically mention the Ġazaleh House include: Safeguarding Syrian Cultural Heritage (programme UNESCO), Blue Shield International; Heritage For Peace, Protection of Cultural Heritage During Armed Conflict, The Aleppo No Strike List.

== Gallery ==
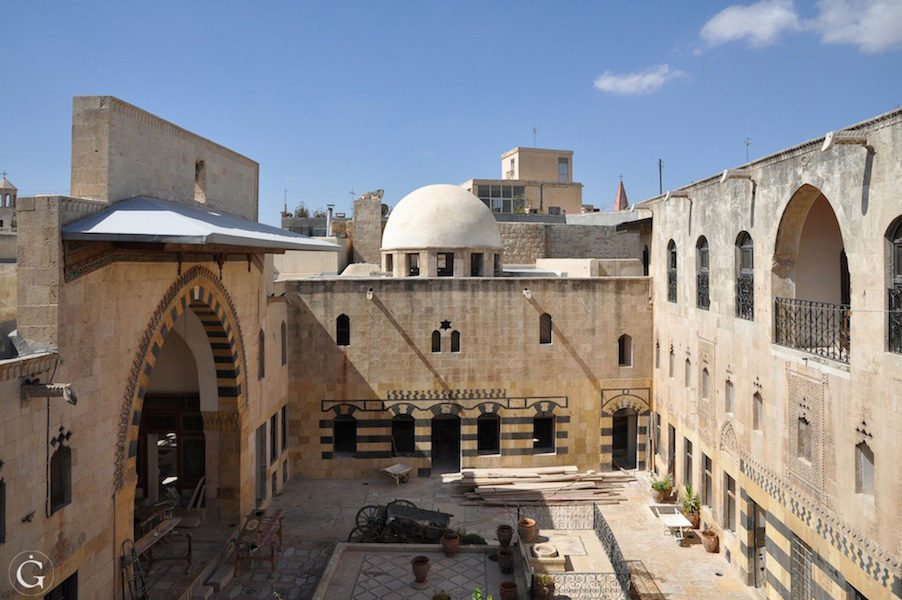
The central courtyard of Beit Ghazaleh (2010)

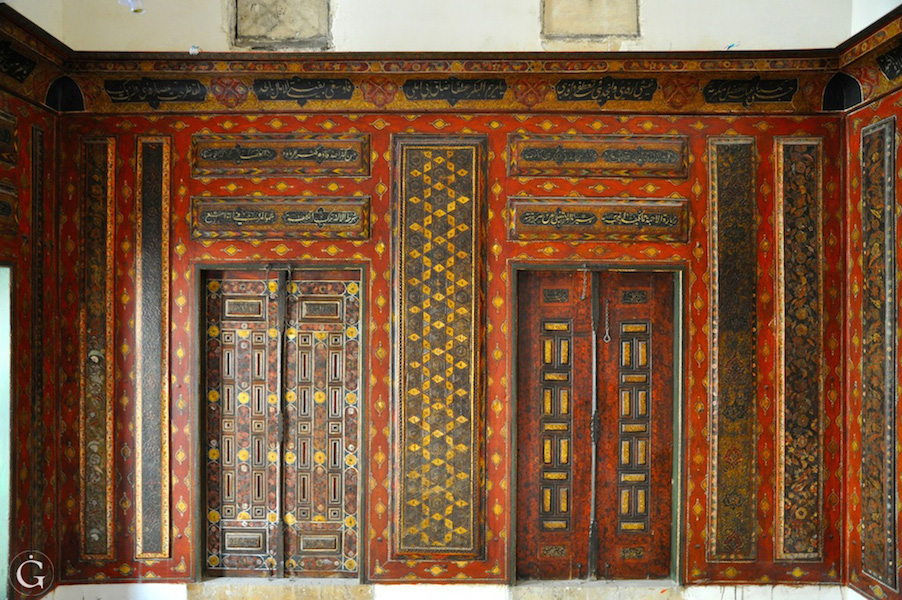
The qoubba's wooden panels of the Ġazaleh House (now missing)

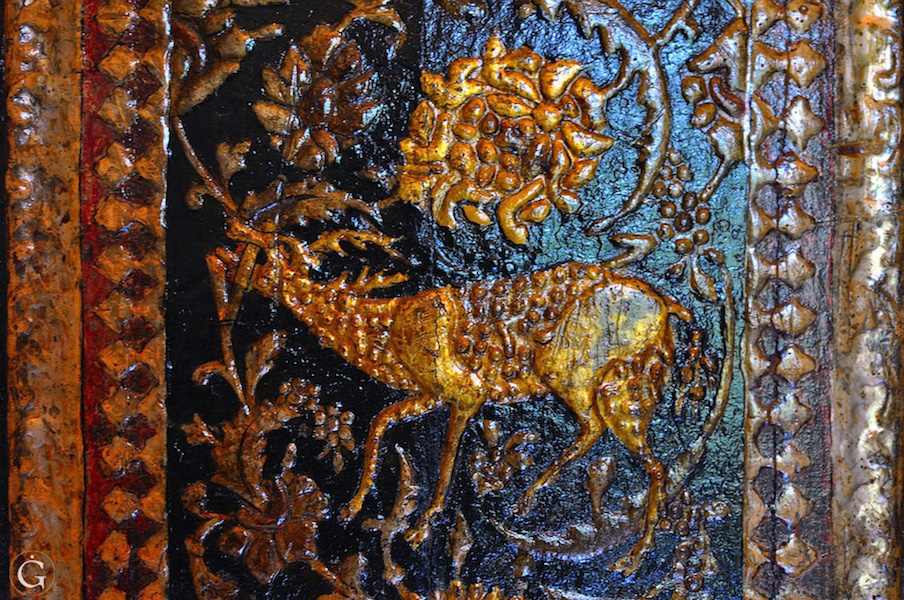
The 'Gazelles' of the Ġazaleh House, panels as seen in the Pharaon Collection (Mouwad Museum) of Beyrouth in 2011.

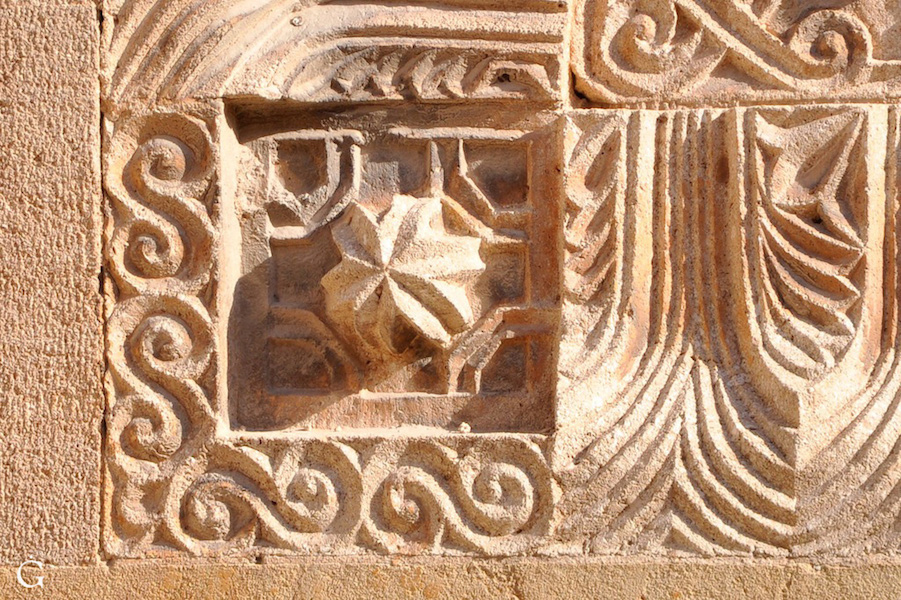
Stonework on the north facade of the Ġazaleh House

Beit Ghazaleh interior of the Qa a (2001)

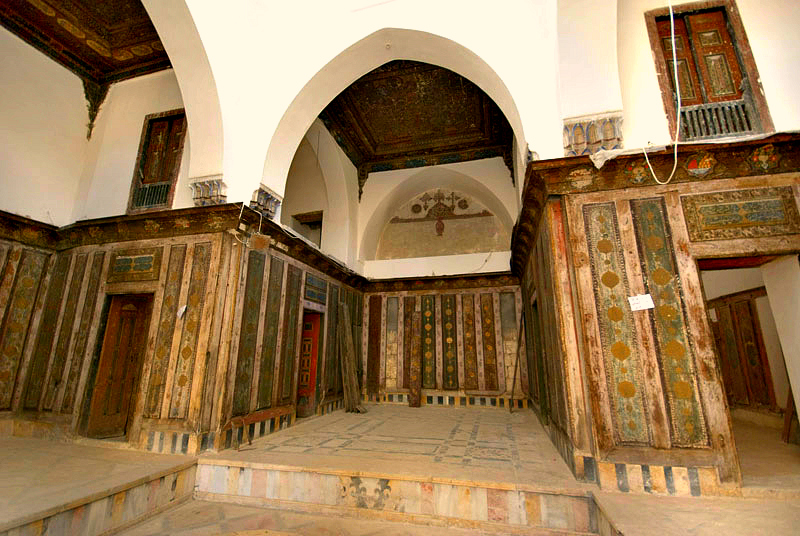
Beit Ghazaleh interior of the qa during restoration

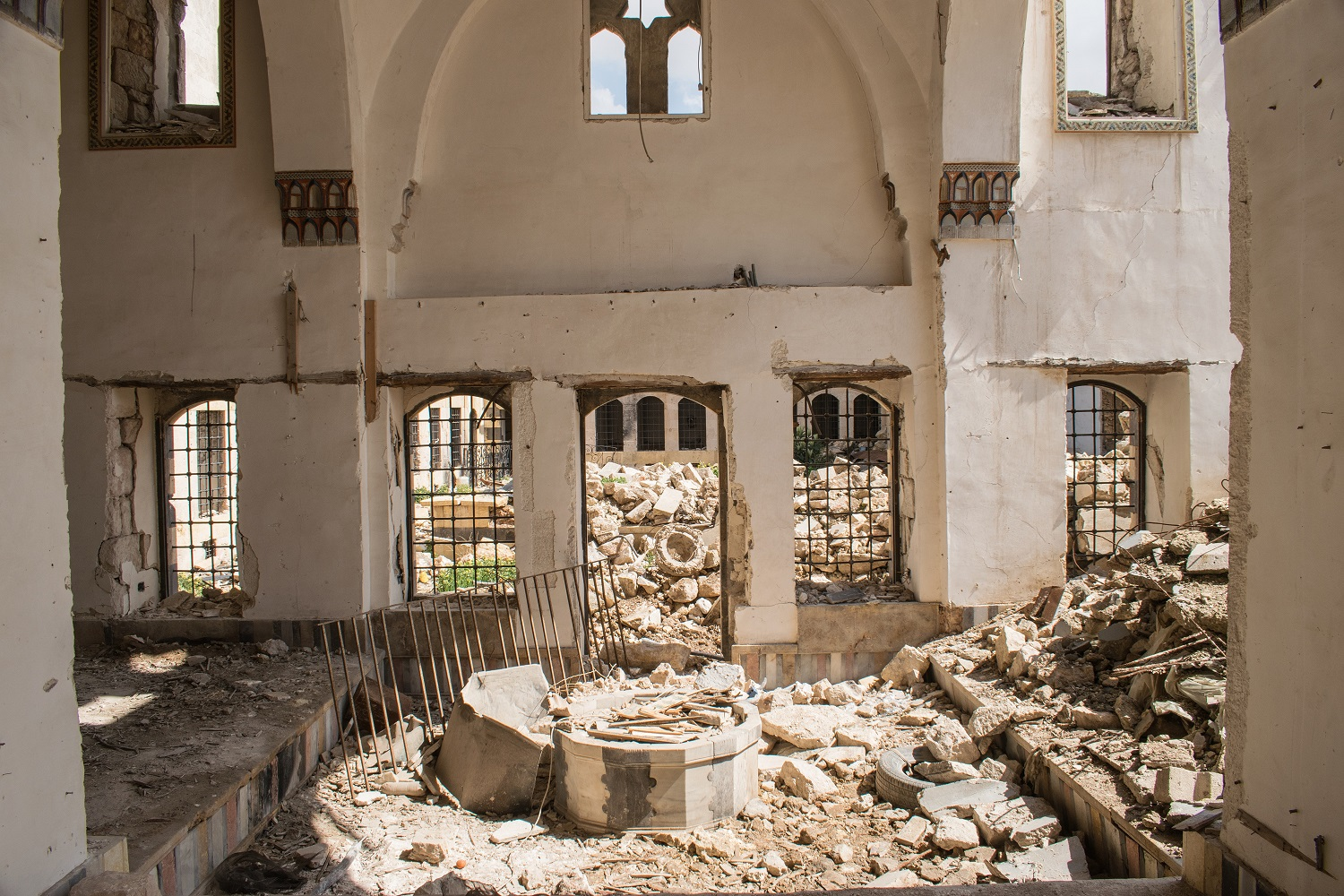
Beit Ghazaleh Qa'a -- its fine decorations were looted before the building was hit by multiple explosions (2017)

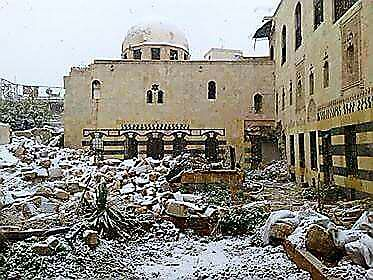
The central courtyard of Beit Ghazaleh (2016)
