= Waqf =

Islamic charitable endowment

A waqf (Arabic: وَقْف; [ˈwɑqf], plural awqāf أَوْقَاف), also called a ḥabs (حَبْس, plural ḥubūs حُبوس or aḥbās أَحْباس), sometimes translated as mortmain property, is a type of irrevocable trust in Islamic law, typically taking the form of an endowment of real estate or other assets to be used for a specified purpose. The person making such a donation is known as a waqif ('donor'), who nominates a trustee (waqf guardian) to manage the property in exchange for a share of the revenues it generates. A waqf can be used for various purposes, including the upkeep of a public building or the provision of a charitable service.

Perhaps the most notable waqf is the Jerusalem Waqf, which manages the al-Aqsa Mosque under the oversight of the Government of Jordan.

Although the waqf system depended on several hadiths and presented elements similar to practices from pre-Islamic cultures, the formal system of waqf trusts emerged from the 9th century onwards (see § History and location below). The waqf has been cited as an historical influence on the early development of the common law system of trusts.

== Terminology ==
In Sunni jurisprudence, the waqf (Turkish: vakıf) is synonymous with the ḥabs (حَبْس, also called ḥubs حُبْس or ḥubus حُبْوس, and commonly rendered habous in French). Habs and similar terms are used mainly by Maliki jurists. In Twelver Shiism, ḥabs is a particular type of waqf, in which the founder reserves the right to dispose of the waqf property. The person making the grant is called al-waqif (or al-muhabbis) while the endowed assets are called al-mawquf (or al-muhabbas).

In older English-language law-related works in the late 19th/early 20th centuries, the word used for waqf was vakouf; the word, also present in such French works, was used during the time of the Ottoman Empire, and is from the Turkish vakıf.

== Definition ==
The term waqf literally means 'confinement and prohibition', or causing a thing to stop or stand still. According to Islamic law, once an asset has been donated as waqf, it cannot be sold, transferred or given as a gift. Once a waqif has verbally or in writing declared a waqf property, it is legally conceived as the property of Allah and must be used to "fulfill public or family needs" as a charitable social service. A waqf property can fall into one of two categories: movable or immovable. A 'movable' asset includes money or shares which are used to finance educational, religious or cultural institutions such as madrasas or mosques. The madrasahs and mosques themselves are an example of an 'immovable' asset, which refers to land or structures open for public use. An important function of the latter is also to provide shelter and community spaces to the poor, also known as the mawquf 'alayh (beneficiaries).

Bahaeddin Yediyıldız defines waqf as a system comprising three elements: hayrat, akarat, and waqf. Hayrat, the plural form of hayr, means 'goodnesses' and refers to the motivational factor behind the vakıf organization; akarat refers to corpus and literally means 'real estates,' implying revenue-generating sources such as markets (bedestens, arastas, hans, etc.), land, and baths; and waqf, in its narrow sense, is the institution(s) providing services as committed in the vakıf deed, such as madrasas, public kitchens (imarets), karwansarays, mosques, libraries, etc.

Generally, the waqf must fulfill three primary constraints:

1. The one endowing the waqf, and its subsequent maintainers, should sequester the principal and allocate the proceeds to charity.
2. The endowment should legally be removed from commodification, such that it is no longer on the market.
3. Its sole purpose must be charitable, and the beneficiary group must be named.
  Islamic Waqf Structure

== Origin in Islamic texts ==
Although there is no direct Quranic injunction regarding awqāf, it can be inferred from Surah Al Imran (3:92): "You will never achieve righteousness until you donate some of what you cherish. And whatever you give is certainly well known to Allah." Their formal conception in Islamic society has been derived from a number of hadiths. It is said that during the time of Muhammad, after the Hijrah, the first waqf was composed of a grove of 600 date palms. The proceeds of this waqf were meant to feed Medina's poor.

In one tradition, it is said that: "Ibn Umar reported, Umar Ibn Al-Khattab got land in Khaybar, so he came to Muhammad and asked him to advise him about it. Muhammad said, 'If you like, make the property inalienable and give the profit from it to charity.' It goes on to say that Umar gave it away as alms, that the land itself would not be sold, inherited, or donated. He gave it away for the poor, the relatives, the slaves, the jihad, the travelers, and the guests. It will not be held against him who administers it if he consumes some of its yield in an appropriate manner or feeds a friend who does not enrich himself by means of it."

In another hadith, Muhammad said, "When a man dies, only three deeds will survive him: continuing alms, profitable knowledge, and a child praying for him."

== Life cycle ==
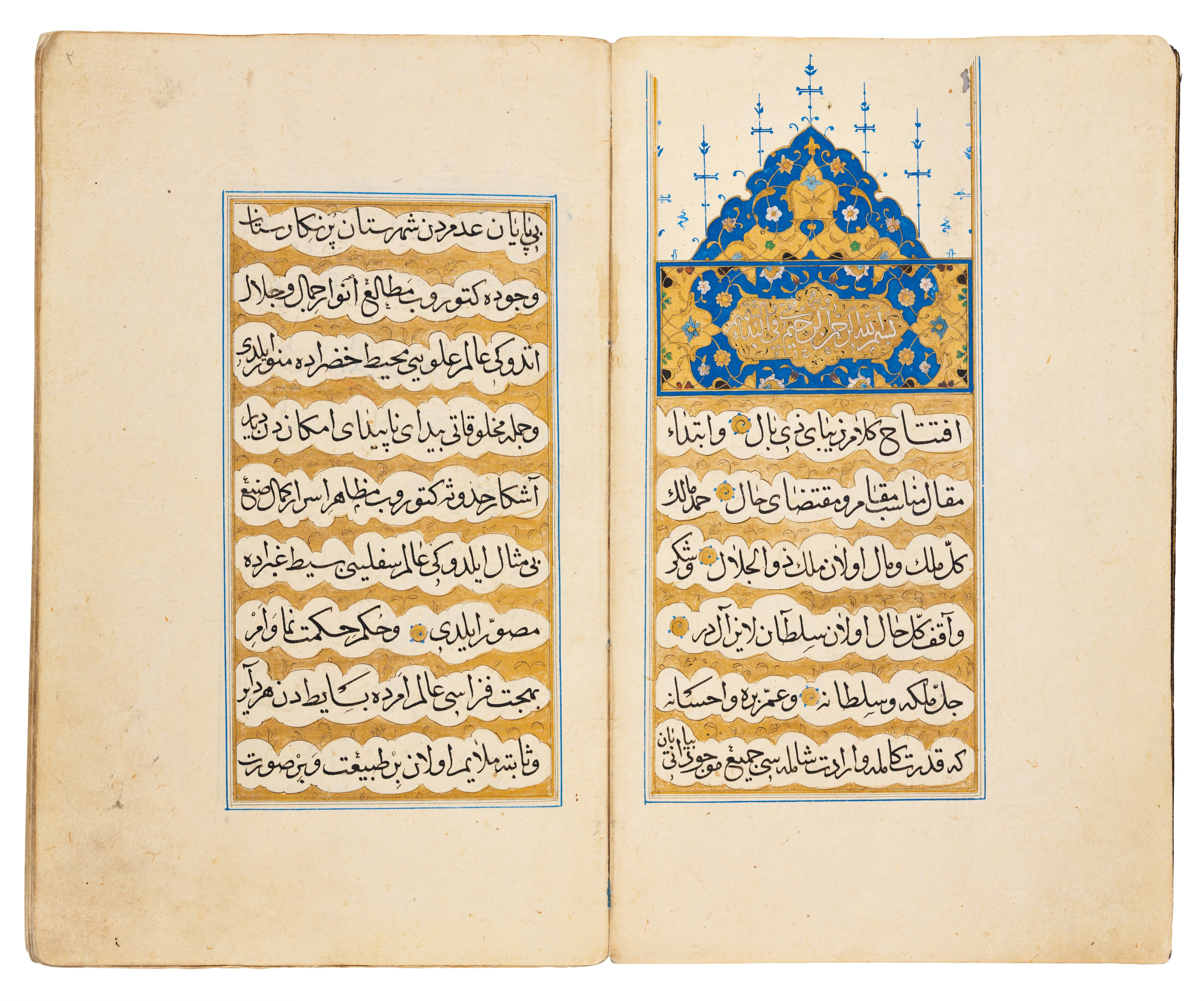
Endowment Deed of Mihrimah Sultan. This document concerns the endowment of properties in Anatolia and Rumelia, from which revenues were used to meet the expenses of the Mihrimah Sultan Mosque complex. April–March 1550. Sadberk Hanım Museum

=== Founding ===
Islamic law places several legal conditions on the process of establishing a waqf.

==== Founder ====
A waqf is a contract; therefore, the founder (called al-wāqif or al-muḥabbis in Arabic) must be capable of entering into a contract. For this, the founder must:

- be an adult
- be sound of mind
- be capable of handling financial affairs
- not be under interdiction for bankruptcy

Although waqf is an Islamic institution, being a Muslim is not required to establish a waqf, and dhimmis may establish a waqf. Finally, if a person is fatally ill, the waqf is subject to the same restrictions as a will in Islam.

=== Characteristics of a waqf ===
- The waqf must be established by someone who is legally capable of disposing of their property, which means they must be an adult of sound mind and a responsible person. It cannot be done by a minor, someone whose mental faculties prevents them from comprehending their choice, or someone lacking legal capacity.
- The person establishing the waqf (the waqif) must designate a specific beneficiary or recipient for the waqf, such as a mosque, a specific individual, or an institution. It cannot be left in his or her discretion.
- The waqf should not be subject to any conditions, hanging or temporary clauses, or be contingent on certain events, like the option to revoke it.
- The waqif (the one establishing the waqf) should not include any conditions that are contrary to the essential conditions, like a condition that allows them to sell or gift the endowed property whenever they wish, or a condition that grants them personal choice or discretion over it.
- The waqf should be of a virtuous and moral nature, reflecting what is ethical and righteous, and it should not support or be associated with corrupt or unethical activities. It should be established with the intention of promoting goodness and benefiting society.
- The property being endowed in the waqf should either be owned by the waqif (the person establishing the waqf) or acquired with the waqif's own funds. It should not involve borrowed money or property that the waqif does not own outright.

==== Waqfiyya (endowment document) ====
Each waqf is supposed to be recorded in an endowment deed, called a waqfiyya. Waqfiyyas follow "Islamic legal and fiscal-geographical conventions." They include the names of the property, the endowed fraction (in 24–qarats), and additional descriptions, most often delimitation of their boundary.

==== Women's contribution to the waqf system ====
Some of the founders of Ottoman awqāf were women, whose establishments had a crucial impact on the economic life of their communities. Out of 30,000 waqf certificates documented by the Directorate General of Foundations, over 2300 of them were registered to institutions that belonged to women. Of the 491 public fountains in Istanbul that were constructed during the Ottoman period and survived until the 1930s, nearly 30% of them were registered under awqāf that belonged to women.

==== Property ====
The property (called al-mawqūf or al-muḥabbas) used to found a waqf must be objects of a valid contract. The objects should not themselves be haram (e.g. khamr or pork). These objects should not already be in the public domain: public property cannot be used to establish a waqf. The founder cannot have pledged the property previously to someone else. These conditions generally apply to contracts in Islam.

The property dedicated to waqf is generally immovable, such as an estate. All movable goods can also form waqf, according to most Islamic jurists. The Hanafi school, however, also allows most movable goods to be dedicated to a waqf with some restrictions. Some jurists have argued that even gold and silver (or other currency) can be designated as waqf.

Documents listing endowments (waqfiyyas) often include the name of the endower, the listed property or fiscal unit, the endowed fraction (in 24-qarats), and a description of its boundary. The boundary descriptions start in Islamic direction of prayer and go counterclockwise by listing different landscape elements. Endowment deeds most often include the conditions of the endowment and its administration.

==== Beneficiaries ====
The beneficiaries of the waqf can be individuals and public utilities. The founder can specify which persons are eligible for benefits (such as the founder's family, the entire community, only the poor, or travellers). Public utilities such as mosques, schools, bridges, graveyards, and drinking fountains can be the beneficiaries of a waqf. Modern legislation categorizes the waqf into two types: "charitable causes," where the beneficiaries are the public or the poor, and "family" waqf, where the founder designates their relatives as beneficiaries. There can also be multiple beneficiaries. For example, the founder may stipulate that half the proceeds go to their family, while the other half goes to the poor.

Valid beneficiaries must satisfy the following conditions:

- They must be identifiable. At least some of the beneficiaries must also have existed at the time of the waqf's founding. The Maliki school, however, hold that a waqf may exist for some time without beneficiaries, and the proceeds accumulated are given to beneficiaries once they come into existence. An example of a non-existent beneficiary is an unborn child.
- The beneficiaries must not be at war with the Muslims. Scholars stress that non-Muslim citizens of the Islamic state (dhimmi) can definitely be beneficiaries.
- The beneficiaries may not use the waqf for a purpose in contradiction of Islamic principles.

There is dispute over whether the founder themselves can reserve exclusive rights to use waqf. Most scholars agree that once a waqf is founded, it cannot be revoked.

The Ḥanafīs hold that the list of beneficiaries includes a perpetual element; the waqf must specify its beneficiaries in case.

==== Declaration of founding ====
The declaration of founding is usually a written document, accompanied by a verbal declaration, though neither are required by most scholars. Whatever the declaration, most scholars (those of the Hanafi, Shafi'i, some of the Hanbali and Shi'i schools) hold that it is not binding and irrevocable until actually delivered to the beneficiaries or put to their use. Once in use, however, the waqf becomes an institution in its own right.

=== Administration ===
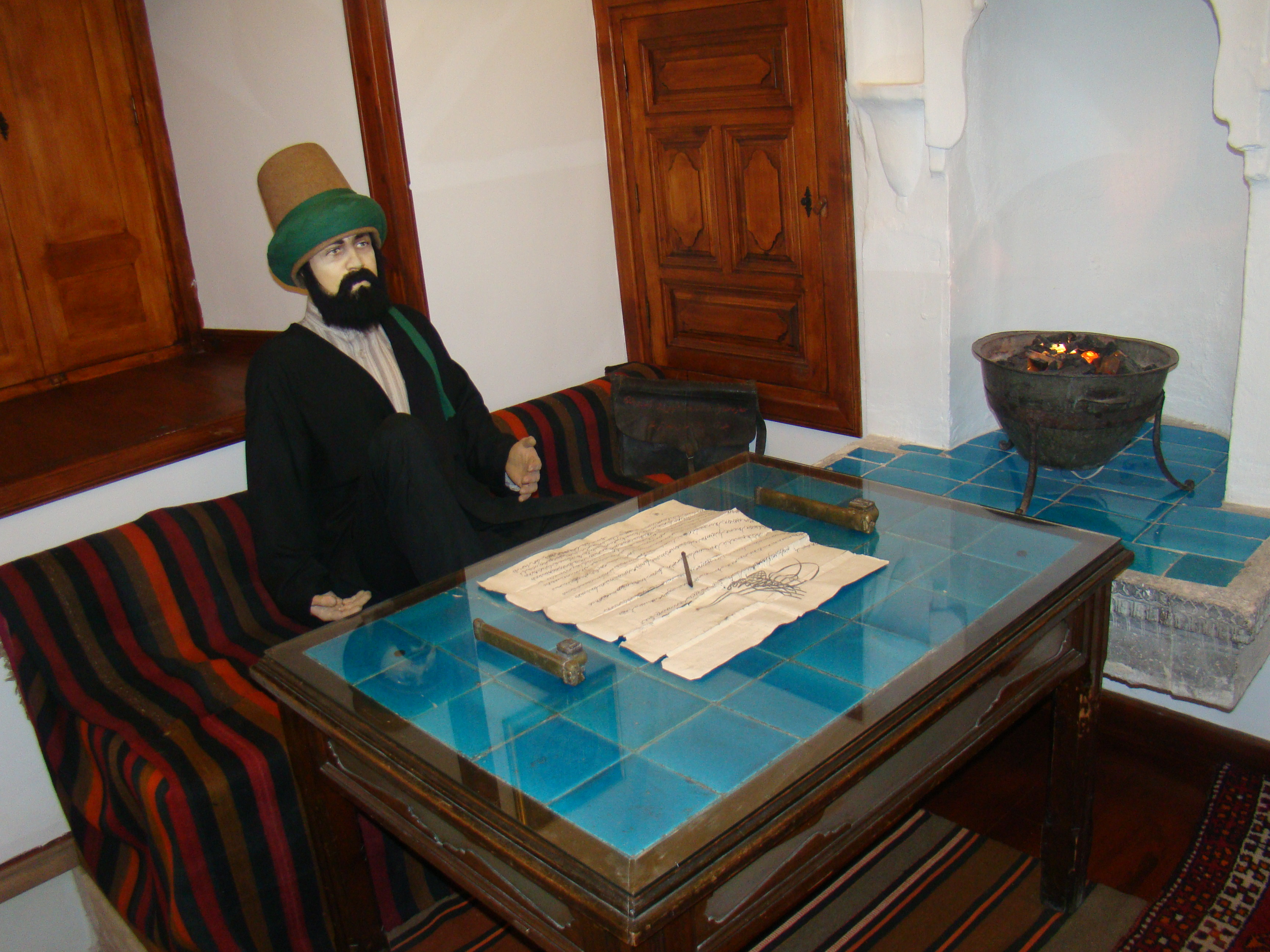
Waqf Writing Room in Mevlana Museum

Usually, a waqf has a range of beneficiaries. Thus, the founder makes arrangements beforehand by appointing an administrator (called nāẓir or mutawallī or ḳayyim) and lays down the rules for appointing successive administrators. The founder may choose to administer the waqf during their lifetime. In some cases, however, the number of beneficiaries is quite limited. Thus, there is no need for an administrator, and the beneficiaries themselves can manage the waqf.

The administrator, like other persons of responsibility under Islamic law, must have the capacity to act and contract. Additionally, trustworthiness and administrative skills are essential. Some scholars require that the administrator of this Islamic religious institution be a Muslim, though the Hanafis drop this requirement.

=== Extinction ===
A waqf is intended to be perpetual and last forever. Nevertheless, Islamic law envisages conditions under which the waqf may be terminated:

- If the goods of the waqf are destroyed or damaged. Scholars interpret this as the case where goods are no longer used in the manner intended by the founder. The remaining goods are to revert to the founder or their heirs. Other scholars, however, hold that all possibilities must be examined to see if the goods of the waqf can be used at all, exhausting all methods of exploitation before termination. Thus, land, according to such jurists, can never become extinguished.
- A waqf can be declared null and void by the ḳāḍī, or religious judge, if its formation includes committing acts otherwise illegal in Islam, or it does not satisfy the conditions of validity, or if it is not used for a valid purpose. Since waqf is an Islamic institution, it becomes void if the founder converts to another religion.
- According to the Malikis, the termination of the waqf may be specified in its founding declaration. As the waqf would expire whenever its termination conditions are fulfilled (e.g., upon the death of the last beneficiary). The waqf property then reverts to the founder or to their heirs.

== History and location ==
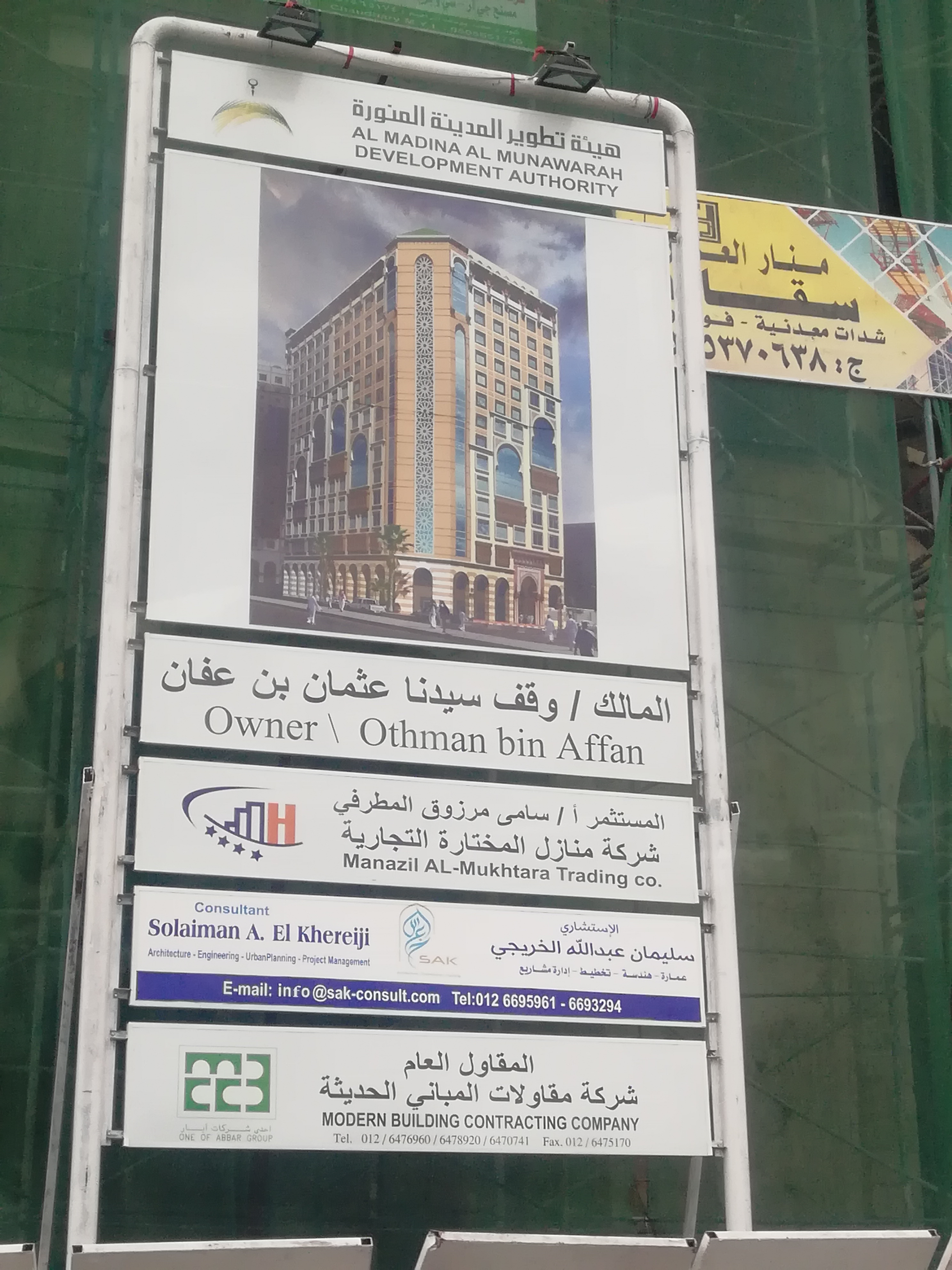
Uthman waqf (Medina)

The practices attributed to Muhammad have promoted the institution of waqf from the earliest part of Islamic history.

The two oldest known waqfiya (deed) documents are from the 9th century, while a third one dates from the early 10th century, all three within the Abbasid Caliphate. The oldest dated waqfiya goes back to 876 CE and concerns a multi-volume edition of the Qur'an currently held by the Turkish and Islamic Arts Museum in Istanbul. A possibly older waqfiya is a papyrus held by the Louvre Museum in Paris, with no written date but considered to be from the mid-9th century. The next oldest document is a marble tablet whose inscription bears the Islamic date equivalent to 913 CE and states the waqf status of an inn, but is in itself not the original deed; it is held at the Eretz Israel Museum in Tel Aviv.

According to Marom,

The latter stages of the Mamluk period witnessed the encumberment of considerable properties as religious endowments [...]. Waqfization aimed [...] to control sources of revenue in a time of property confiscation and socio- economic upheavals and political insecurities. According to Islamic law, only an owner (mallāk) can dedicate properties as waqf, therefore necessitating the production, confirmation and dissemination of official legal deeds which document the process [...]. Because of the permanence [of] endowments under shari‘ah law, the Ottoman judiciary collected, copied and abridged many of these endowments, whose original deeds are otherwise lost.

By the early 1800s, more than half of all arable land in the Ottoman Empire was classified as a waqf. This figure included 75 percent of arable land in present-day Turkey, one-fifth in Egypt, one-seventh in Iran, one-half in Algeria, one-third in Tunisia, and one-third in Greece.

=== Saudi Arabia ===
The total number of registered endowments in Saudi Arabia is 33,229.

=== Jerusalem ===
In the 16th century, the Haseki Sultan Complex charitable complex was founded by the wife of Suleyman the Magnificent and serviced 26 villages; the institution also included shops, a bazaar, two soap plants, 11 flour mills and two bathhouses located in Ottoman Syria and Lebanon. For several centuries, the income generated by these businesses contributed in the maintenance of a mosque, a soup kitchen, and two traveler and pilgrim inns.

=== Egypt ===
The earliest pious foundations in Egypt were charitable gifts, and not in the form of a waqf. The first mosque built by 'Amr ibn al-'As is an example of this: the land was donated by Qaysaba bin Kulthum, and the mosque's expenses were then paid by the Bayt al-mal. The earliest known waqf, founded by financial official Abū Bakr Muḥammad bin Ali al-Madhara'i in 919 (during the Abbasid period), is a pond called Birkat Ḥabash together with its surrounding orchards, whose revenue was to be used to operate a hydraulic complex and feed the poor.

=== India ===
Early references to waqf in India can be found in the 14th-century work Insha-i-Mahru by Aynul Mulk ibn Mahru. According to the book, Muhammad of Ghor dedicated two villages in favor of a congregational mosque in Multan, and, handed its administration to the Shaykh al-Islām (highest ecclesiastical officer of the Empire). In the coming years, several more waqf were created, as the Delhi Sultanate flourished.

As per the Wakf Act 1954 (later Wakf Act 1995) enacted by the government of India, waqf are categorized as (a) waqf by user such as graveyards, Musafir Khanas (Sarai) and Chowltries etc., (b) waqf under Mashrutul-khidmat (Service Inam) such as Khazi service, Nirkhi service, Pesh Imam service and Khateeb service etc., and (c) Wakf Alal-aulad is dedicated by the Donor (Wakif) for the benefit of their kith and kin and for any purpose recognised by Muslim law as pious, religious or charitable. After the enactment Wakf Act 1954, the Union government directed to all the states governments to implement the Act for administering the wakf institutions like mosques, dargahs, hussainiyas, graveyards, takhiyas, eidgah, anjumans, and various religious and charitable institutions. A statutory body under Government of India, which also oversees State Wakf Boards. In turn the State Wakf Boards work towards management, regulation and protect the Wakf properties by constituting District Wakf Committees, Mandal Wakf Committees and Committees for the individual Wakf Institutions.

In 2006, the Sachar Committee reported there were about 500,000 registered waqf properties with 600,000 acres (2,400 km^{2}) land in India, and Rs. 60 billion book value.

In 2025, The Economist estimated that India has about 872,000 waqf properties, more than any other country. Within India, only the military and railways control more land.

According to the Ministry of Minority Affairs, "As on 11.03.2026, details of 6,39,807 waqf properties have been initiated for uploading on the Portal. Out of these, 3,06,773 properties have been validated and approved by the designated Approvers while 38,755 properties have been rejected during the verification process.

The Indian Express states, "The Centre said there has been a 116% rise in land controlled by waqf boards across the country after the amendment in Waqf Act in 2013, and flagged "misuse" of waqf provisions to encroach upon private and government properties."

=== Zanzibar ===
While it is difficult to pinpoint the historical origins of awqāf in East Africa, the practice began to formalize in the 17th century after Said bin Sultan had cemented his control over Zanzibar and the East African coastline. Until this point, archeological evidence has unearthed several old mosques along the Swahili coast that are believed to be informal waqf dating as far back as the 8th Century. The formalization of waqf can be traced back to 1820 when Sultan Said moved the Al Bu Said-ruled Omani Sultanate to Stone Town, Zanzibar. This marked a shift from waqf as an Islamic scriptural imperative to a local and centralized institutional practice legitimated by the royal family. From this point onward, the urban development of the port city of the East African archipelago was shaped by waqf practices. As such, the majority of greater Stone Town became waqf property, made available for free habitation or cemeteries by noblemen, approximately 6.4% of which was designated as public housing for the poor.

Economic changes in Zanzibar shaped waqf practices over time. Under Omani rule, slavery and the cash crop industry was booming, specifically because of the exportation of spices, which strengthened the elite class of the Omani aristocracy. In the context of growing inequality, the nobility used waqf to provide public housing to slaves and peasants as well mosques, madrasas and land for free habitation and cultivation. For instance, all 66 mosques in Stone Town were waqf privately financed and owned by noble waqif as a display of social status and duty to their neighborhood. Under this system, the architectural configuration of Stone Town was entirely managed by the Sultanate and its network of nobility. This effectively allowed elites to practice zakat through waqf while doubling as a means to secure control over the local population.

The East African archipelago experienced an economic recession from 1860 to 1880, which threatened the private property of the elite class. In a time when landowners were forced to sell or mortgage their properties to foreign investors, waqf became a means to legally safeguard properties under conditions of debt. By donating assets to the public, the aristocracy managed to preserve their wealth while providing land, financial support, and community spaces, such as mosques, to the general public.

When Zanzibar became a British protectorate in 1890, almost half the island was waqf property. In order to establish control, the British realised that they would either have to privatise waqf or gain administrative control over them. A series of decrees were subsequently issued to incorporate all waqf properties into the colonial bureaucracy. The Waqf Property Decree, which established the Waqf Commission in 1905, comprised a majority of British officials and a minority of Islamic authorities representing the Sultanate, which maintained a degree of influence over the island. This shift marked the further formalization of waqf into the state apparatus, a move which allowed the English to directly control the preservation and maintenance of publicly used assets as well as the surplus revenues generated from them. It was also part of what Ali Mazrui calls the 'dis-Islamization' and 'de-Arabization' of Swahili culture by British colonialism, a strategy used to rid the territory of Omani influence. While Mazrui speaks of this in the context of the Swahili language, it can also be seen by the way in which the British deviated from the Islamic values underpinning waqf practices. What was initially intended as a charitable practice that would provide social services was replaced by a focus on profit over public welfare. This ruptured the social and political relations that were formed between the upper and lower classes during Omani rule as the underlying values used to manage waqf were lost in translation.

The Zanzibari Revolution which followed a year after independence in 1963 installed a new government under the helm of the Afro-Shirazi Party (ASP). An important part of the revolution was the prosecution of the Zanzibari elite of Arabic descent. This left a significant portion of land, much of which was waqf, to be nationalised by the newly independent state as part of their socialist development programme. The revolution highlights a crucial turn point in waqf institutions in Zanzibar, namely the 'public' ownership of these assets that disposed of the need for a waqif. In this way, waqf was further cemented as a political institution regulated by a centralized state while being managed by mutawallis. It allowed the poorest inhabitants of Stone Town to reside in waqf buildings that were previously reserved for the relatives of waqif families. While this may appear to be an act of good fortune, the nationalisation of all waqf assets led to the loss and destruction of many properties because of a lack of funding because the state did not have the means to preserve waqf as effectively as it would have been under the private control of the waqif nobility.

According to Bowen, when practicing Islam, Muslims "engage in a dialogue between potentially conflicting cultural orders: the universalistic imperatives of Islam (as locally understood) and the values embedded in a particular society". While Bowen analyzes how Islamic rituals are practiced in context, this logic can arguably be applied to how the history of waqf in Zanzibar is shaped by "local cultural concerns and to universalistic scriptural imperatives". In fact, this conflict is evident in the way in which waqf has historically served a dual purpose in Zanzibar; to satisfy the inalienable Islamic law of waqf as a source of charity and thereby public welfare while doubling as a tool of domination used by the ruling class to maintain the dependence of the lower classes. While the former was somewhat preserved as a scripture-based normative foundation of waqf institutions, the nature and dynamics of the latter was contingent on the nature and dynamics of regime changes in Zanzibar. Under Omani rule, waqf was practiced by the aristocratic class as an outward demonstration of Islamic piety while simultaneously serving as a means to control slaves and the local population through social housing, educational facilities and religious institutions like mosques. When an economic recession threatened the position of the elite, noblemen used waqf to maintain ownership of their properties to avoid selling or mortgaging their land thereby altering the economic function of the practice. After the British gained control of Zanzibar and further formalized waqf as a political institution, it was used to culturally subvert the local population and gradually rid it off its Arabic origins. This persisted after independence when the newly independent state sought to further eliminate Arabic influence by nationalizing all waqf properties as a means to gain control of private property.

=== Other ===
The waqf institutions were not popular in all parts of the Muslim world. In West Africa, very few examples of the institution can be found, and were usually limited to the area around Timbuktu and Djenné in Massina Empire. Instead, Islamic west African societies placed a much greater emphasis on non-permanent acts of charity. According to expert Illife, this can be explained by West Africa's tradition of "personal largesse." The imam would make himself the collector and distributor of charity, thus building his personal prestige.

According to Hamas, all of historic Palestine is an Islamic waqf. This belief, a relatively recent one, forms part of the group's mythology.

In Southeastern Europe, there are several places in Bosnia and Herzegovina that were originally built under the waqf system, such as Gornji Vakuf, and Donji Vakuf.

In Poland, the waqf (Polish: wakuf) has been legally recognized since 1936 as a civil law institution, exclusive to the Muslim Religious Association pursuant to the provisions of the Act on the Relations between the State and the Muslim Religious Association.

The Evkaf Administration of Cyprus oversaw the waqfs of Cyprus. It was affected by the reforms in the Ottoman empire and the governance of British Cyprus. After the Turkish invasion of Cyprus in 1974, Evkaf was limited to control the properties in North Cyprus, losing access to those under the control of the Republic of Cyprus.

== Funding of schools and hospitals ==
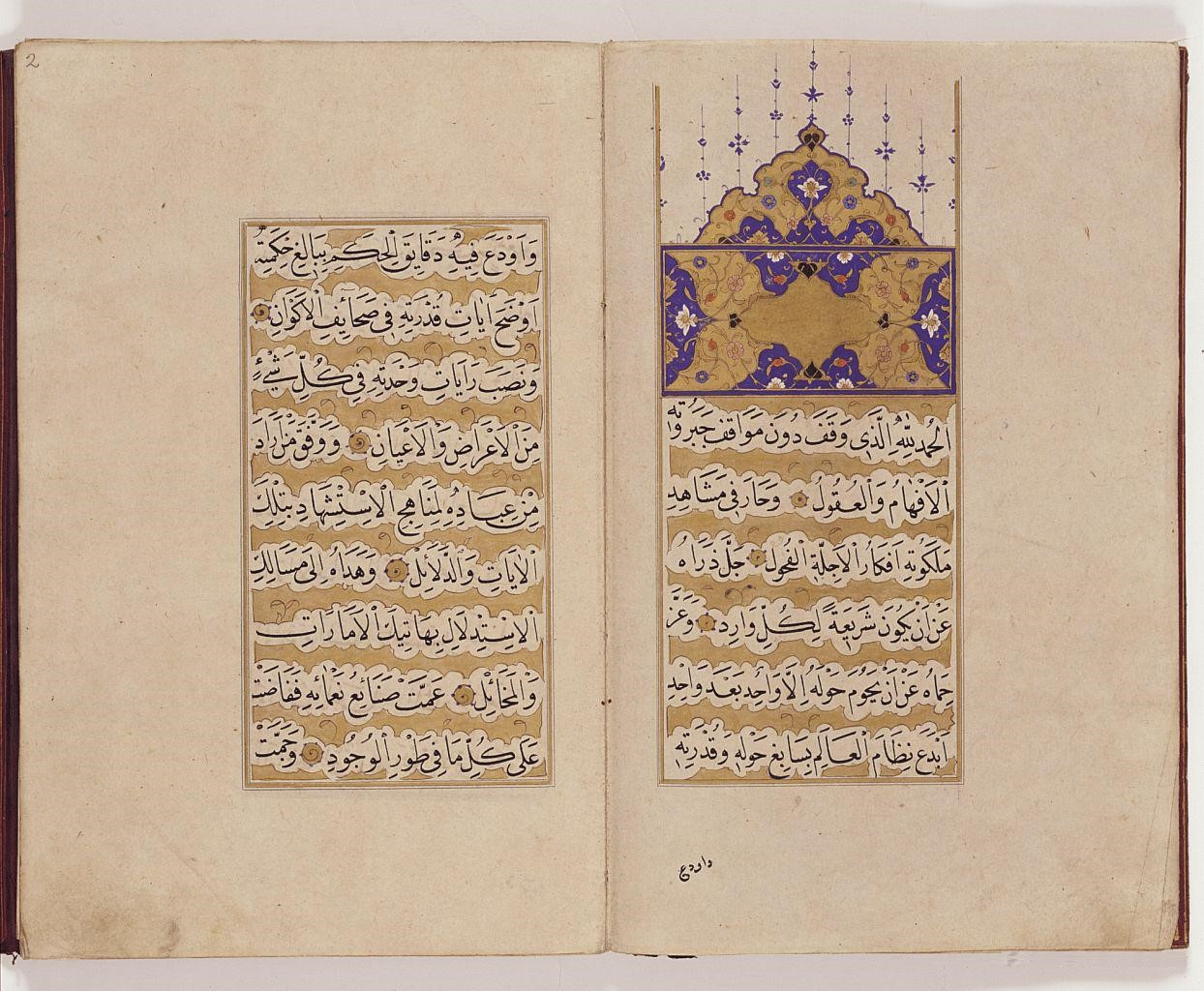
Endowment Charter (Waqfiyya) of Hürrem Sultan. The deed mentioned the buildings known from later sources as the Haseki Hürrem Sultan Mosque, Madrasa and Imaret (soup-kitchen), and contain a detailed explanation as to how expenditures will be made to take care of the endowment's operations, such as the care and cleaning of the buildings, the salaries of the people who worked in them, and so forth. AD 1556–1557 (AH 964). Museum of Turkish and Islamic Arts

After the Islamic waqf law and madrassah foundations were firmly established by the 10th century, the number of Bimaristan hospitals multiplied throughout Islamic lands. By the 11th century, many Islamic cities had several hospitals. The waqf trust institutions funded the hospitals for various expenses, including the wages of doctors, ophthalmologists, surgeons, chemists, pharmacists, domestics and all other staff, the purchase of foods and medicines; hospital equipment such as beds, mattresses, bowls and perfumes; and repairs to buildings. The waqf trusts also funded medical schools, and their revenues covered various expenses such as their maintenance and the payment of teachers and students.

From the more peculiar examples of healthcare-related waqfs, in the city of Tripoli, a man had set up a waqf which employed two people who would "walk through the hospitals every day and speak quietly to one another in the patients' hearing, remarking on their improvement and good colour".

== Comparisons with trust law ==
The waqf in Islamic law, which developed in the medieval Islamic world from the 7th to 9th centuries, bears a notable resemblance to the English trust law. Every waqf was required to have a waqif (founder), mutawillis (trustee), qadi (judge) and beneficiaries. Under both a waqf and a trust, "property is reserved, and its usufruct appropriated, for the benefit of specific individuals, or for a general charitable purpose; the corpus becomes inalienable; estates for life in favor of successive beneficiaries can be created" and "without regard to the law of inheritance or the rights of the heirs; and continuity is secured by the successive appointment of trustees or mutawillis."

The only significant distinction between the Islamic waqf and English trust was "the express or implied reversion of the waqf to charitable purposes when its specific object has ceased to exist", though this difference only applied to the waqf ahli (Islamic family trust) rather than the waqf khairi (devoted to a charitable purpose from its inception). Another difference was the English vesting of "legal estate" over the trust property in the trustee, though the "trustee was still bound to administer that property for the benefit of the beneficiaries." In this sense, the "role of the English trustee therefore does not differ significantly from that of the mutawalli."

Personal trust law developed in England at the time of the Crusades, during the 12th and 13th centuries. The Court of Chancery, under the principles of equity, enforced the rights of absentee Crusaders who had made temporary assignments of their lands to caretakers. It has been speculated that this development may have been influenced by the waqf institutions in the Middle East.

== See also ==
- Central Waqf Council (India)
- Jerusalem Islamic Waqf
- Charitable trust
- Islamic economic jurisprudence
- Islamic economics in the world
- Private foundation
- Trust law
- Zakah
- Waqf of Ibshir Mustafa Pasha Complex
- AWQAF Africa
- Haryana Waqf Board (India)
- Ministry of Awqaf (Egypt)
- Ministry of Evkaf (Ottoman Empire)
- Office of the Waqf Administrator (Bangladesh)
