= Combat operations in 2015 during the Battle of Aleppo =

A timeline of combat operations during the Battle of Aleppo throughout the year 2015.

== January ==
On 5 January, the rebels recaptured the Majbal (Sawmills) area of al-Brej after fighting that killed or wounded no less than 20 soldiers. They also captured the southern entrance of the stone quarries known as al-Misat, forcing government troops to retreat to the north. Later, it was reported that the Islamic Front and Jaish al-Muhajireen wal-Ansar managed to seize the Manasher al-Brej area and were trying to advance and take control over al-Brej Hill with which they could seize the military supply road from the Aleppo Central Prison to the Handarat and al-Mallah areas.

The next day, the rebels reportedly took control over the al-Akhdar Mosque, a mill and the al-Tawattor al-Aali area of al-Brej. The clashes reportedly left one rebel and 6 government fighters dead.

On 8 January, the Army and pro-government militias conducted a counter-attack against areas seized by the rebels in previous days.

On 22 January, the rebels reportedly advanced in al-Mallah and Seifat areas.

On 24 January, rebels reportedly took control over some positions in al- Brej Hill after violent clashes against government forces supported by loyal militia.

== February ==
On 3 February, rebels clashed with government troops around Handarat camp. The rebels reportedly seized al- Misat Hill in the northern eastern entrance of Aleppo.

On 4 February, the Army retook Al-Misat Hill after the rebels held it for 2 hours.

On 17 February, the Syrian Arab Army as well as Afghani and Iranian foreign fighters launched a major offensive in northern Aleppo, with the aim of cutting the last rebel supply routes into the city, as well as relieving the rebel siege of the Shi'a-majority towns of Zahra'a and Nubl to the north-west of Aleppo. Bad weather conditions and an inability to call up reinforcements ultimately stalled the government offensive.

By 19 February, the rebels launched a counter offensive, retaking two out of four positions lost to government forces in the previous two days. 90 government forces were killed and 80 opposition fighters, with tens of prisoners taken on each side. A military source brought the name of over 78 Al Nusra fighters killed in the ongoing clashes in Northern Aleppo.

== March ==
On 4 March, the rebels tunnel bombed part of the Air Force Intelligence building in the northeast of the city and then launched an assault in an attempt to capture the facility. The blast caused a 2.3 tremor registered by the European-Mediterranean Seismological Centre. The ensuing clashes left 20 soldiers and 14 rebels dead. The attack ultimately failed.

On 9 March, opposition forces launched an assault on Handarat, north of Aleppo, after reportedly noticing confusion in the ranks of government troops after the February fighting. It was initially reported that opposition forces captured Handarat, north of Aleppo. However, later it was reported by opposition sources the rebels managed to capture only 40–50% of the village, while the Army remained in control of the northern portion of Handarat. A military source stated they still controlled 80% of Handarat, while a rebel field commander claimed that opposition forces controlled 75%.

On 18 March, after almost 10 days of fighting, the military fully expelled the rebels from Handarat and re-established control of the village.

== April ==
Rebel undermining of Al Hatab Square buildings in late April 2015

On 13 April, Islamist opposition forces and al-Nusra Front renewed their assault on the Air Force Intelligence building, again utilizing a tunnel bomb followed by an assault. Much of the Air Force Intelligence building was reportedly damaged as a result of the tunnel bomb.

Between 27–29 April, the FSA and Ahrar ash-Sham launched an operation in the old city of Aleppo and around Al-Hatab Square in the Al-Jdayde District, which included tunnel bombs and shelling of buildings where soldiers were stationed. The attack intended to breach the front lines that remained in place since the beginning of the conflict. The rebels claimed to have killed 76 troops in these operations however the line of confrontation remained in place.

Numerous monuments, including churches, a mosque, a waqf complex, the wool souk and Sahat al Hatab were heavily damaged or destroyed by the explosions.

== June ==
In preparation for a new offensive, the rebels heavily shelled government-held parts of the city, leaving 43 civilians dead and 190 wounded on 15 June. On 17 June, rebel forces captured the western neighborhood of Rashideen from government forces, and the day after, they also claimed to have pushed into the large Kurdish community of Khaldiyeh. State TV, however, denied both losses, and said the situation was relatively calm. The pro-opposition SOHR group confirmed only the rebel capture of Rashideen and that there was fighting in the outskirts of Khaldiyeh. The rebels also captured Tal Al-Afghani hill, near Bashkoy, north of the city. However, government troops recaptured the hill on 19 June. Throughout 19 and 20 June, a new round of rebel shelling killed 19 more civilians. The latest rebel assaults were reportedly the start of a large campaign, but except for mobilizing around the city and making the notable advance in Rashideen, the rebels had still not made major progress.

== July ==
On 2 July, a major offensive was launched by two rebel coalitions, Fatah Halab and Ansar Sharia, the latter of which includes the Al-Qaeda-linked al-Nusra Front, with fighting focusing on the Jamiyat al-Zahra frontline. By the next day, the rebels seized some buildings in Jamiyat al-Zahra, but the advance was of no strategic importance and came at a cost of heavy casualties, with 35 rebels being killed amidst heavy air-strikes. At least 18 soldiers were killed in the fighting.

On 4 July, the Fatah Halab managed to seize the Scientific Research Center on Aleppo's western outskirts, thus overcoming the first major government fortification and potentially threatening government-held areas of Aleppo. Still, government troops managed to recapture the areas they lost the previous day in Jamiyat al-Zahra. Later during the day, government fighters launched a counter-attack against the Scientific Research Center, and managed to enter the eastern outskirts of the Center but were forced to retreat outside the complex's walls after heavy shelling. 12 more rebels and 12 soldiers were killed in the clashes. As of 5 July, the attack on Jamiyat al-Zahra had largely failed, while the military was still attempting to recapture the Center.

On the evening of 6 July, a suicide bomber hit government positions in Jamiyat al-Zahra, leaving 25 government fighters dead. The ensuing fighting also left 19 rebels dead and opposition activists claimed rebel forces managed to capture several buildings. Fighting also continued at the Center.

It was reported on 20 July that the body of a kidnapped high ranking FSA-leader, Hussein Qintar, had been found by the wayside. The FSA 1st Lieutenant had been severely beaten and shot in the head by unknown assassins in the northern city of Aleppo.

On 31 July, the rebels launched a failed attack on a military base in Aleppo's outskirts, leaving 25 rebels and nine soldiers dead.

== September ==
On 22 September, two dozen tanks and 900 NDF reinforcements arrived in Aleppo, with the intent of recapturing the Scientific Facility. Several hundred additional NDF were expected in the coming days.

== October ==
By October 2015, the SAA was reportedly still struggling to capture the Scientific Facility. On 2 October, however, 11 rebel combatants were killed in skirmishes with the SAA.

On 8 October, Brigadier General Hossein Hamedani of the Islamic Revolutionary Guard Corps was killed on the outskirts of Aleppo while on an advisory mission for the Syrian Armed Forces.

On 9 October, the SAA and NDF reportedly captured Jabboul City from ISIL, in the Aleppo Governorate's eastern countryside, marking the Syrian government troops' first presence in the area in three years.

On 10 October, the SAA and NDF attacked ISIL positions east of Aleppo, killing 15 of its fighters and capturing a hilltop as well as the rebel-held village of Duwayr Al-Zeitoun. It marked the first time the SAA had advanced in northern Aleppo since January 2015.

By 13 October, ISIL captured four rebel-held villages northeast of Aleppo, while the Army seized the Syria-Turkey Free Trade Zone, the al-Ahdath juvenile prison and cement plant.

On 14 October, fighting between ISIS and rebel groups started in the villages of Ahras and Tel Jabin, while more fighting occurred in the rural lands north of Aleppo. While Russian planes bombed several buildings and vehicles at the headquarters of Jabhat al-Nusra, outside of Aleppo.

On 16 October, the army launched their large-scale southern Aleppo offensive after almost one year of inactivity along the rural area in the Azzan Mountains. The army captured the villages of Abtin, al-Waddihi, and Qalaat Al-Najam, along with the Defense Battalion Base and the farms surrounding it. The main objective of the army's southern Aleppo offensive was to recapture the Azzan Mountains from the rebels, while also creating a larger buffer-zone around the Syrian Government's only highway leading to the provincial capital.

On 17 October a US official said that up to 2,000 Iran-backed forces had been deployed in Aleppo. While a member of Al Nusra (Saudi national Sanafi Al Nasr) was killed in an airstrike in the Aleppo province, along with two other prominent members of Al Nusra. It is not known whether it was an American or Russian airstrike that killed the three.
