= Al-Hatab Square =

Al-Hatab Square ساحة الحطب
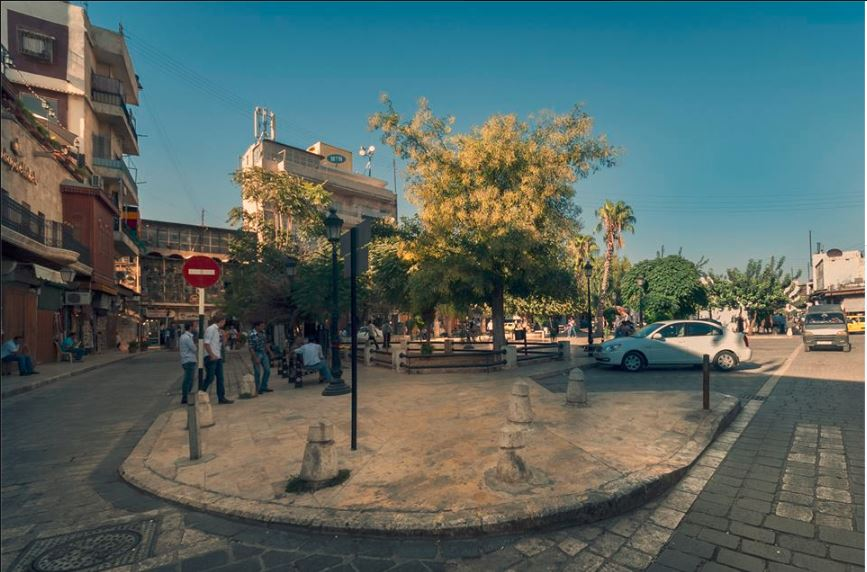
- Al-Hatab Square

- Location within Aleppo
- 36°12′26″N 37°09′25″E
- Location: Aleppo, Syria

History
- Built: 1420s

Site notes
- Area: 2,500 m^{2} (27,000 sq ft)

Al-Hatab Square (Arabic: ساحة الحطب, Sahat al Hatab) is one of the oldest squares in the city of Aleppo. It is located in the old Jdeydeh Quarter, outside the historic walls of the Ancient City of Aleppo. The square suffered catastrophic damage during the Syrian civil war.

== History ==
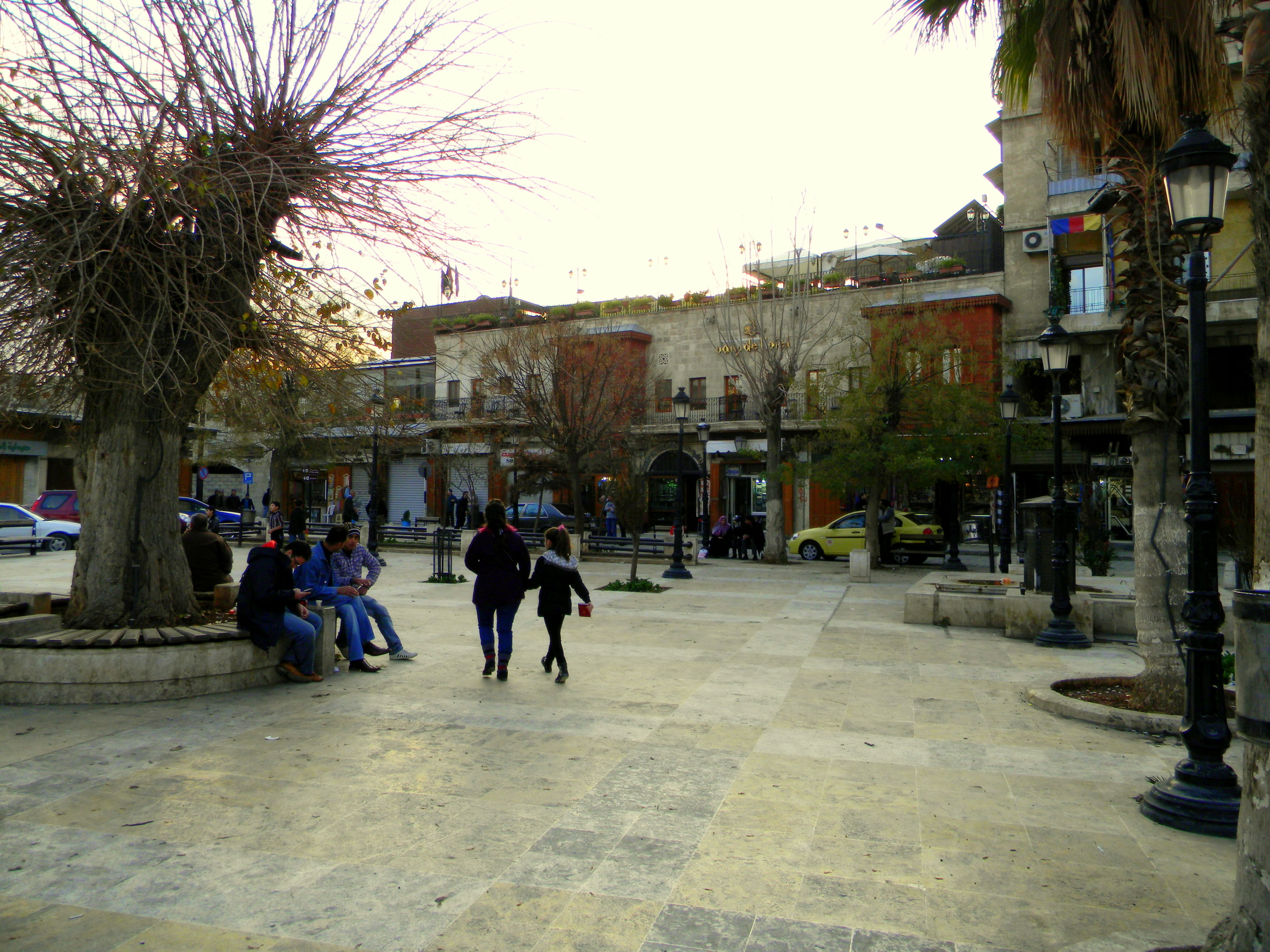
Sahat al-Hatab as seen in 2011

In 1400, the Mongol-Turkic leader Tamerlane captured the city of Aleppo from the Mamluks and massacred many of its inhabitants. After the withdrawal of the Mongols, the Muslim population returned to Aleppo. In contrast the Christian residents, unable to resettle in their own city quarters, established a new neighbourhood just to the north of the city walls in the early 1420s. This area became known as Aleppo's al-Jdeydeh (Jdeideh) Quarter (for "new district" in Arabic).

Al-Hatab Square became the centre of this newly established quarter and was surrounded by many churches, hammams, khans, caravanserais and caeserias. Many Christians chose this area as a number of fifteenth century churches had been located there. A number of structures here were built on earlier Byzantine foundations. By the seventeenth century, a mosque (al-Sharaf Mosque), and sprawling waqf complex with shops and coffee house were established near there to help service the local inhabitants and visitors. Many Armenians also settled in the area as early as the 1600s to develop the growing silk trade with Persia.

The square and khans quickly became one of the busiest commercial hubs of the city. Many European traders would also come to do business here as many of their local agents and translators lived in this area.

The 1850 massacre of Christians and others in Aleppo also originated in and around Al-Hatab Square.

== Renovation and revitalisation ==
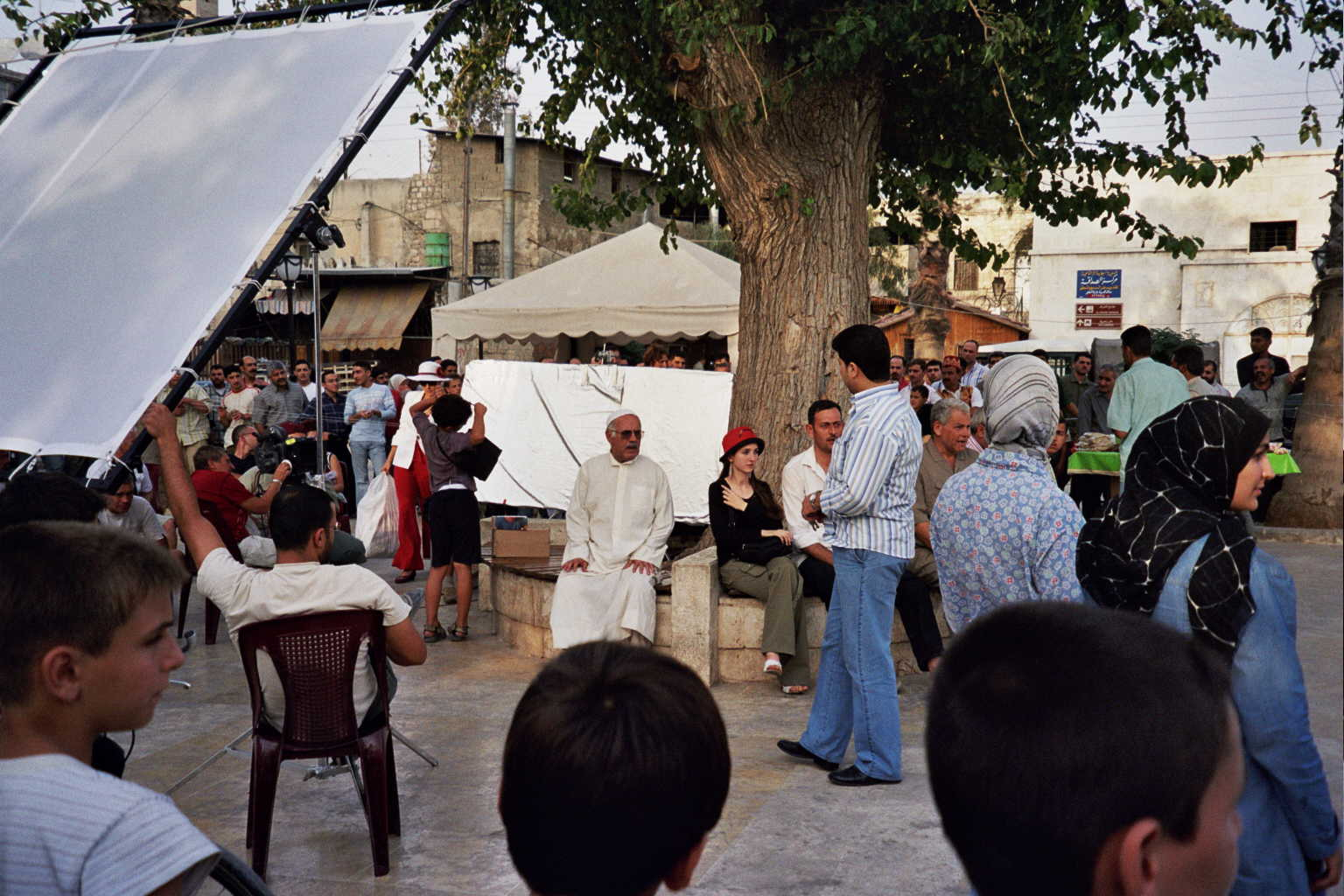
Film set on the renewed Al Hatab Square in 2005

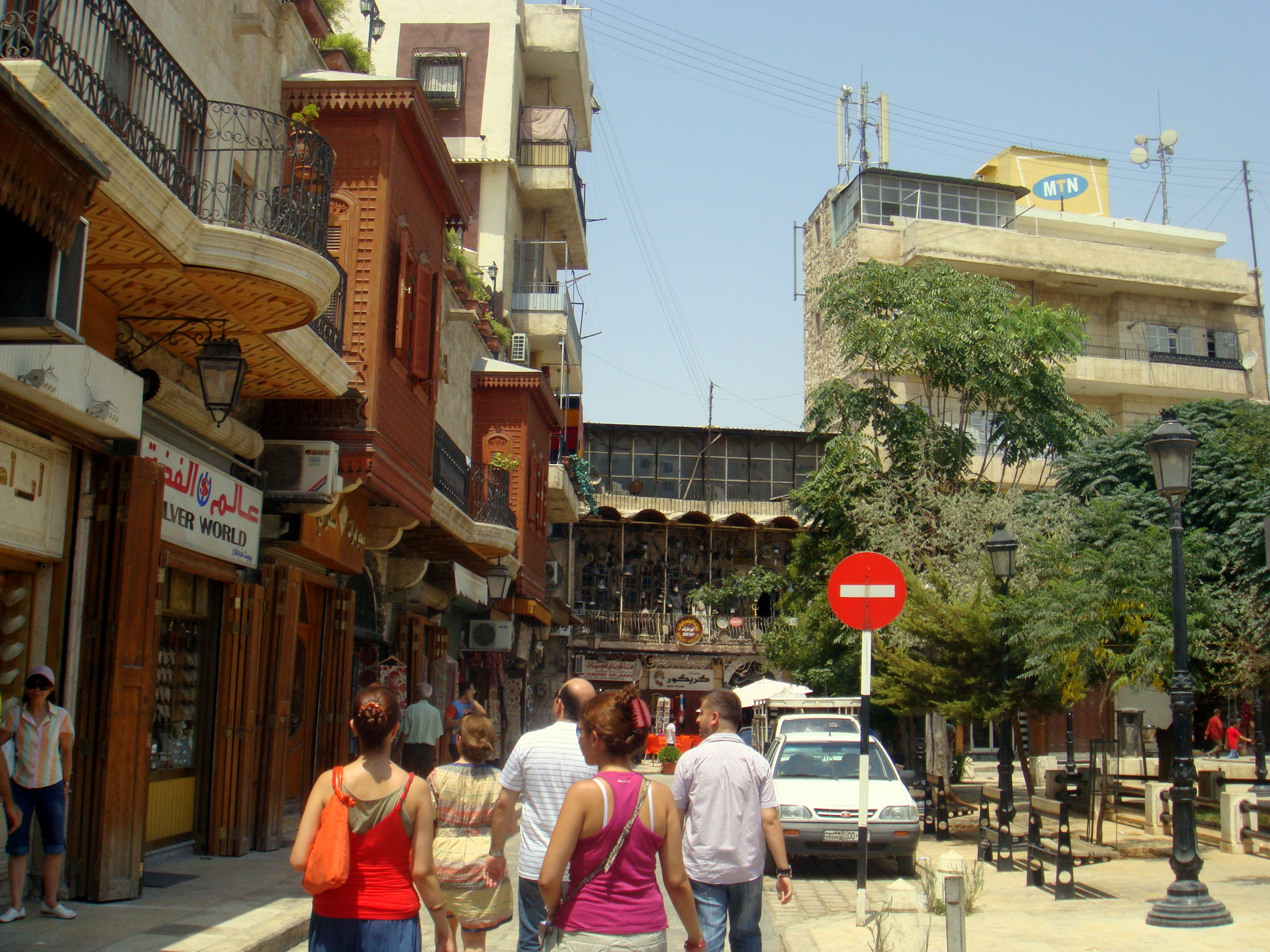
Tourists at al-Hatab Square

By 2011 Sahat al Hatab square, and the Jdeideh neighbourhood around it, had underdone a revitalisation process. It became home to many boutique hotels housed in historic buildings such as the Zamaria House, museums such as the Beit Ghazaleh and Beit Achiqbash, and number of noted restaurants that celebrated the local cuisine.

The square, which had once been built over with trader's sheds, was rehabilitated as a shared and open public space. Its expanse, and the streets around it, went on to foster a vibrant mix of Syrian families and foreign tourists.

This civic project, as part of a plan to protect the Old City of Aleppo, began in 1995 came with some controversy regarding land speculation, land use and its impact on existing residents. The project was also a recipient of international award for urban planning and renewal.

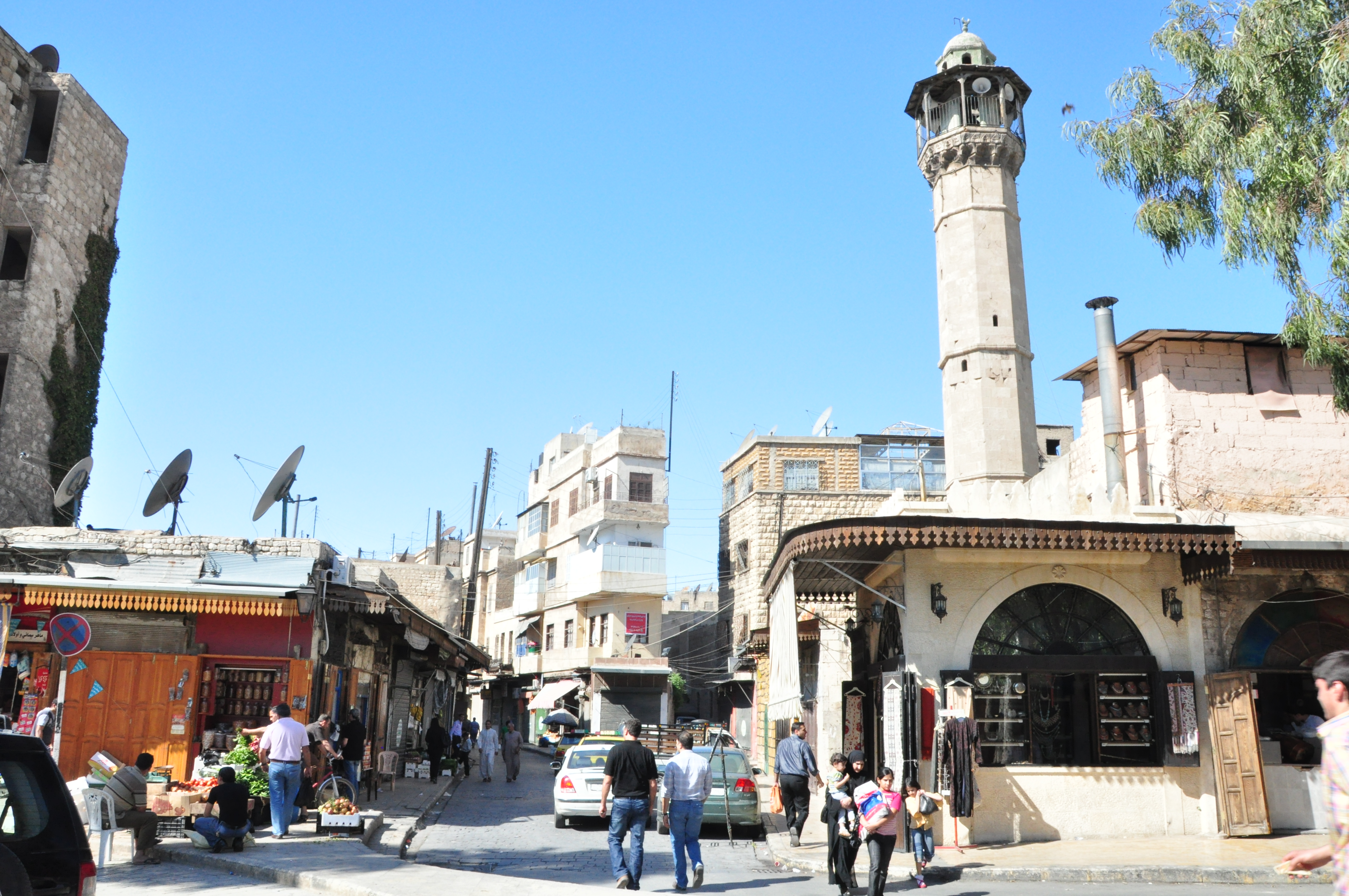
The Al-Sharaf mosque on Sahat al Hatab square

The square became a popular destination, especially for visitors passing through the narrow alleyways of Aleppo's Old City—it was home to many shops of antiques and handmade jewellery.

The famous ful parlor Abu Abdo was also located near the square.

== Recent developments ==
Sahat al Hatab Square and Aleppo's Jdeydeh district suffered catastrophic damage in April 2015

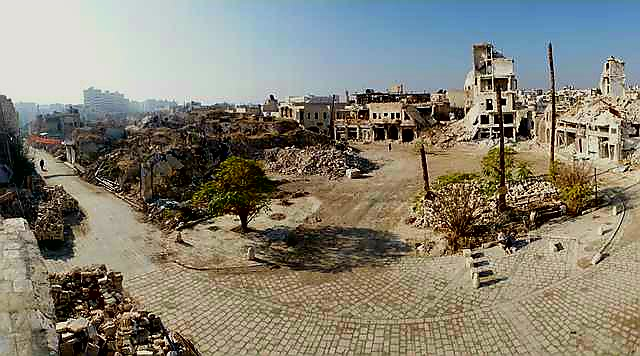
Al Hatab Square as seen in 2017 after backfilling of craters

Sahat Al Hatab suffered catastrophic damage during the Syrian civil war that began in Aleppo in July 2012. A series of huge underground explosions conducted by the armed opposition under the square in April 2015 devastated it along with the surrounding historic buildings.

Al Hatab Square, and its al-Jdayde (Jdeideh) Quarter, found itself on the front line from the beginning in what became a war of attrition between combatant forces.

The area, like much of the old city, remained a closed militarized zone for most of this period and was heavily damaged from fighting. Official damage assessments conducted after the evacuation of rebel forces determined Sahat al Hatab to have been "highly affected" by civil war fighting.

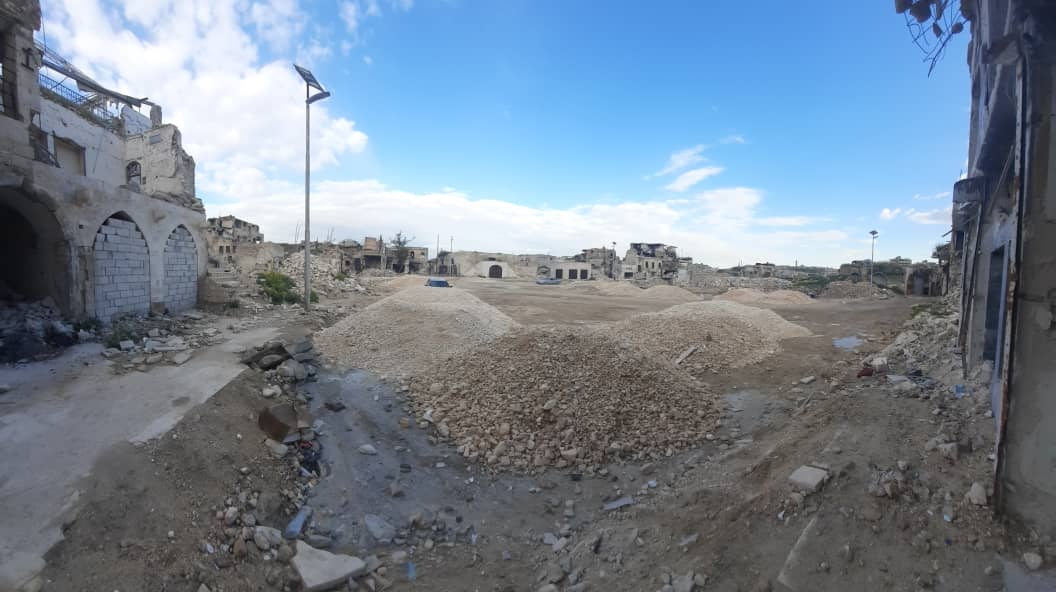
Hatab Square after the start of the renovation in 2021

While the Jdayde Hotel along with other buildings surrounding the square were mostly destroyed, the craters on it were backfilled and its surface levelled during 2017. In 2018 further remediation work was undertaken in the area. By 2021, work began on a comprehensive renovation of the square, with the first phase estimated at LS 200 million.

Christmas market was organized on the square in December 2022 with the participation of heads of the Christian denominations and a number of Islamic clerics.

== Sources and further reading ==
- Bruce Masters (1991) Aleppo the Ottoman Empire's caravan city in Edhem Eldem, Daniel Goffman, and Bruce Masters (1999), "The Ottoman City between East and West: Aleppo, Izmir, and Istanbul." Cambridge: Cambridge University Press, pp. 17–78.
- Jean-Claude David (1990) L'espace des chrétiens à Alep. Ségrégation et mixité, stratégies communautaires (1750–1850) Revue du monde musulman et de la Méditerranée Année 1990 Volume 55 Numéro 1 pp. 150–170
- Masters, Bruce (February 1990). "The 1850 Events in Aleppo: An Aftershock of Syria's Incorporation into the Capitalist World System". International Journal of Middle East Studies. Cambridge University Press. 22: 3–20. JSTOR 164379.
- Burns, Ross, Aleppo: A History. London : Routledge, Taylor & Francis Group, 2017.p. 197, 231–2.
- Mansel, Philip, Aleppo: The Rise and Fall of Syria’s Great Merchant City. London: I.B. Tauris, 2016.
- Mıroğlu, Ebru Aras (2005). "The Transformation of Urban Space at the Conjunction of the Old and New Districts: The City of Aleppo" Middle East Technical University. Thesis: pp. 60–5.
- Francesco Lanyafame and Eduardo Rojas (eds., 2011) City Development: Experiences in the preservation of ten world heritage sites. Washington DC: Inter-American Development Bank. Publication Code IDB-MG-121, 377pp.
- Bernadette, Bairs-Zars (2010) Developing heritage: activist decision-makers and reproducing narratives in the Old City of Aleppo, Syria. Thesis Massachusetts Institute of Technology, Dept. of Urban Studies and Planning.
- United Nations Institute for Training and Research (2018) "FIVE YEARS OF CONFLICT The State of Cultural Heritage in the Ancient City of Aleppo" unesdoc.unesco.org. archive from the original.

== Gallery ==
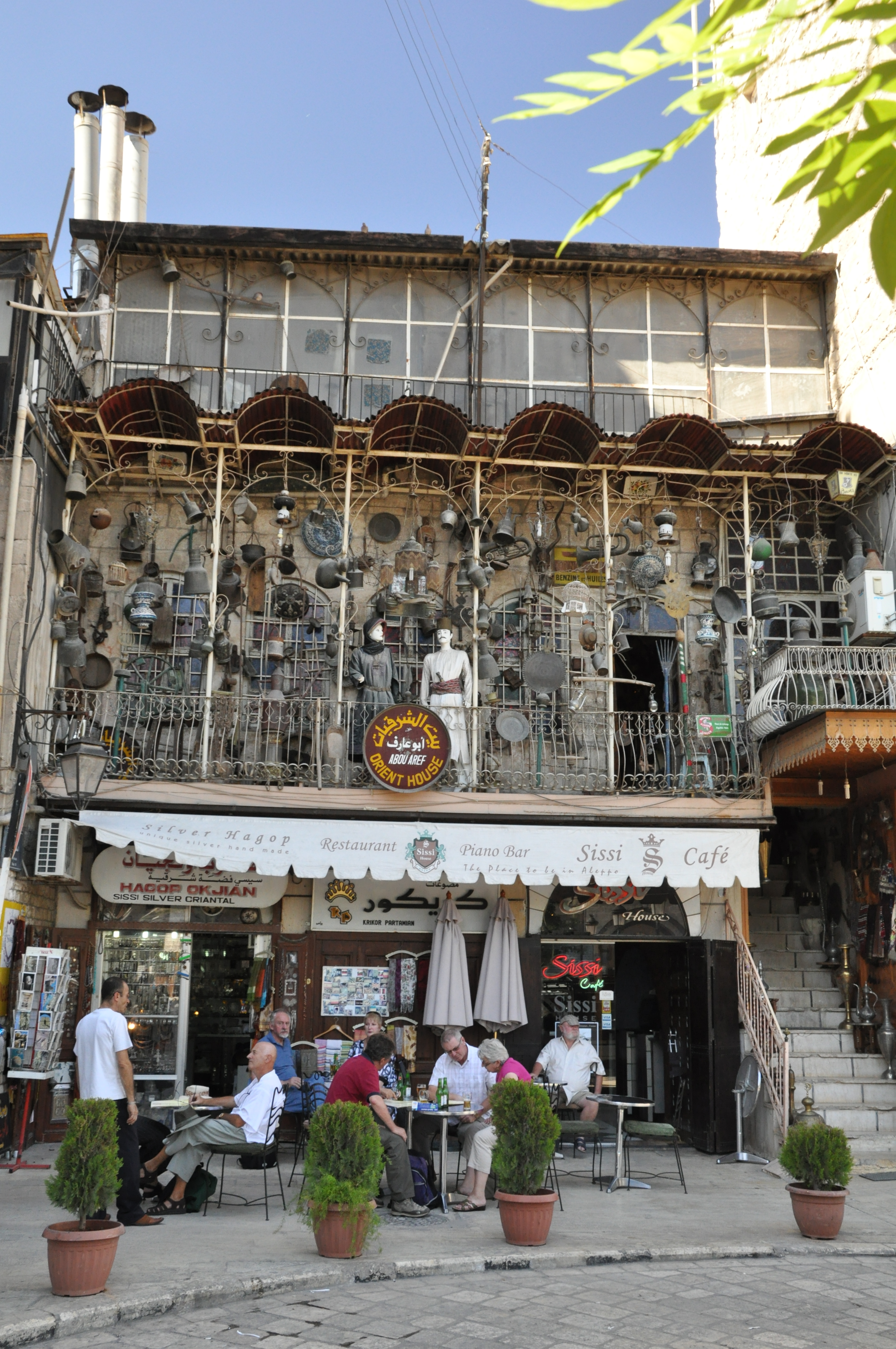
Antiques shop at the square

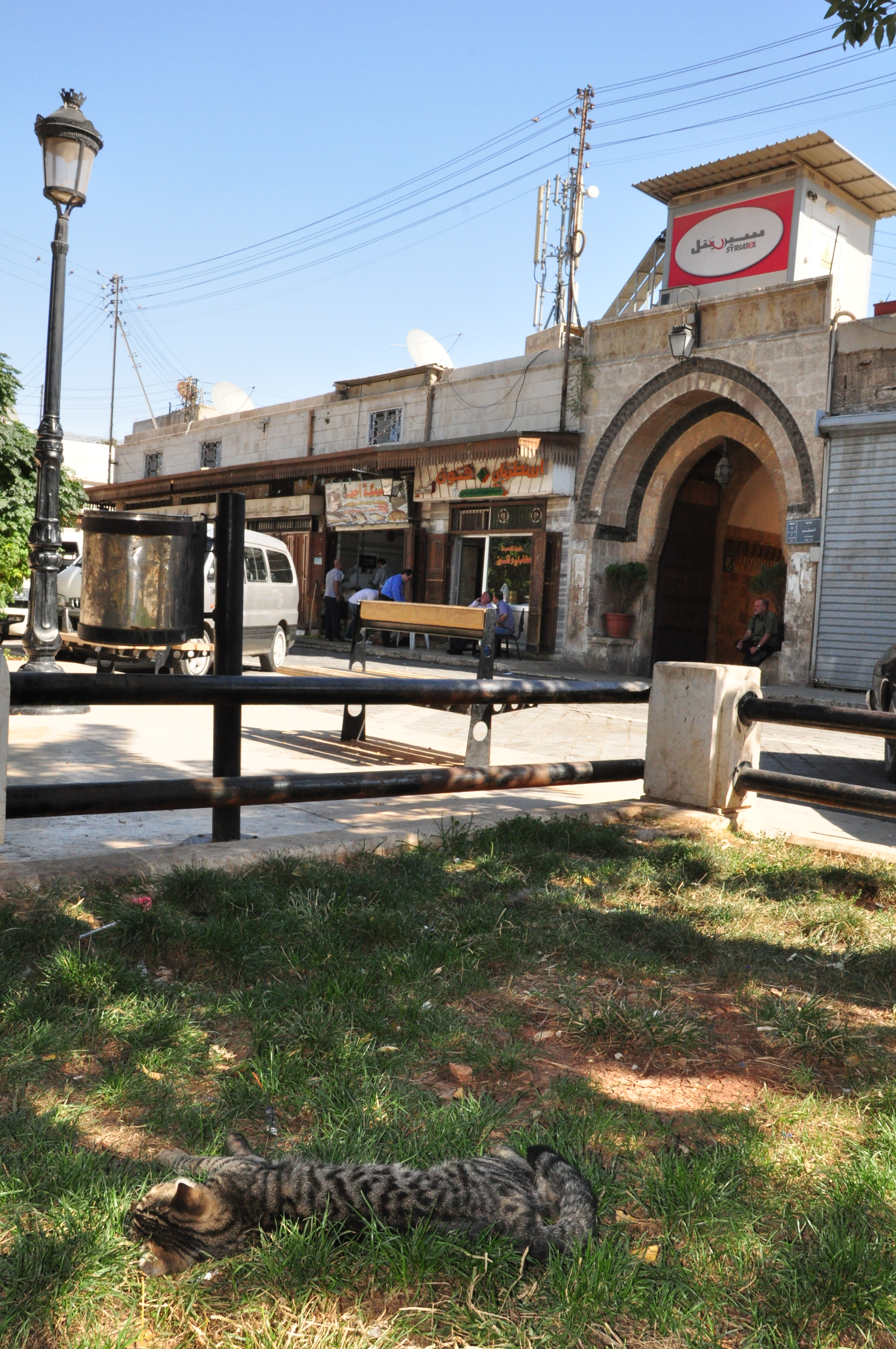
View from the Al Hatab square

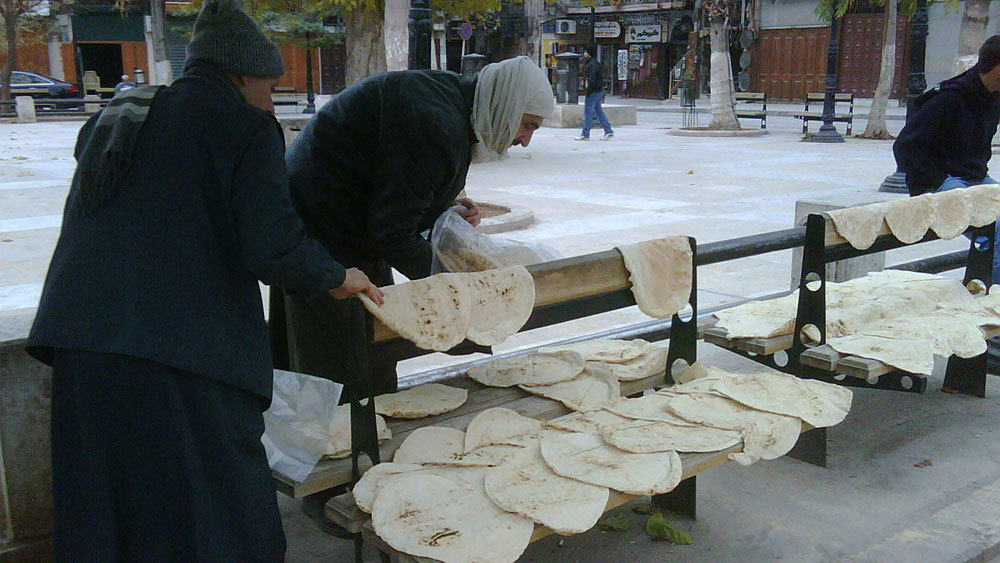
Bread being dried at Al Hatab Square in 2010

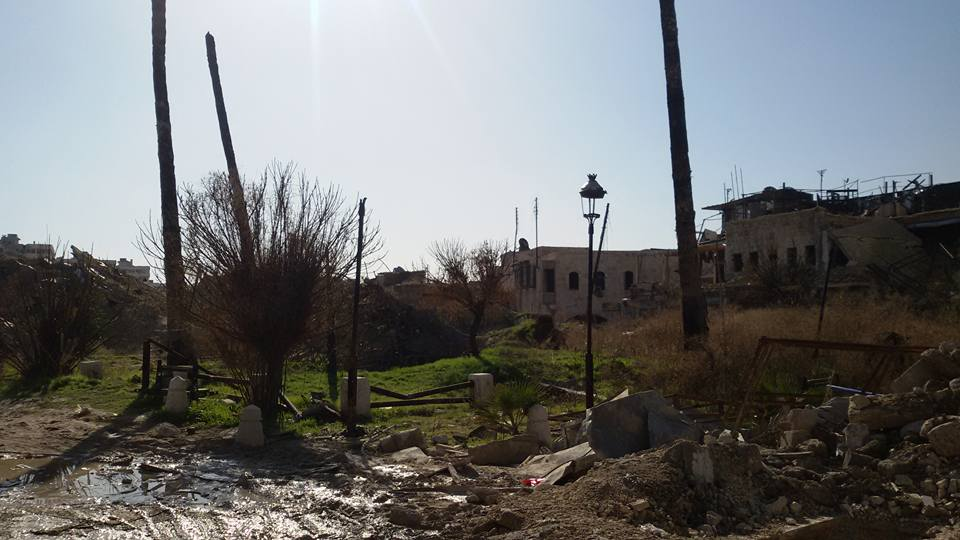
Sahat Al Hatab as seen in January 2017

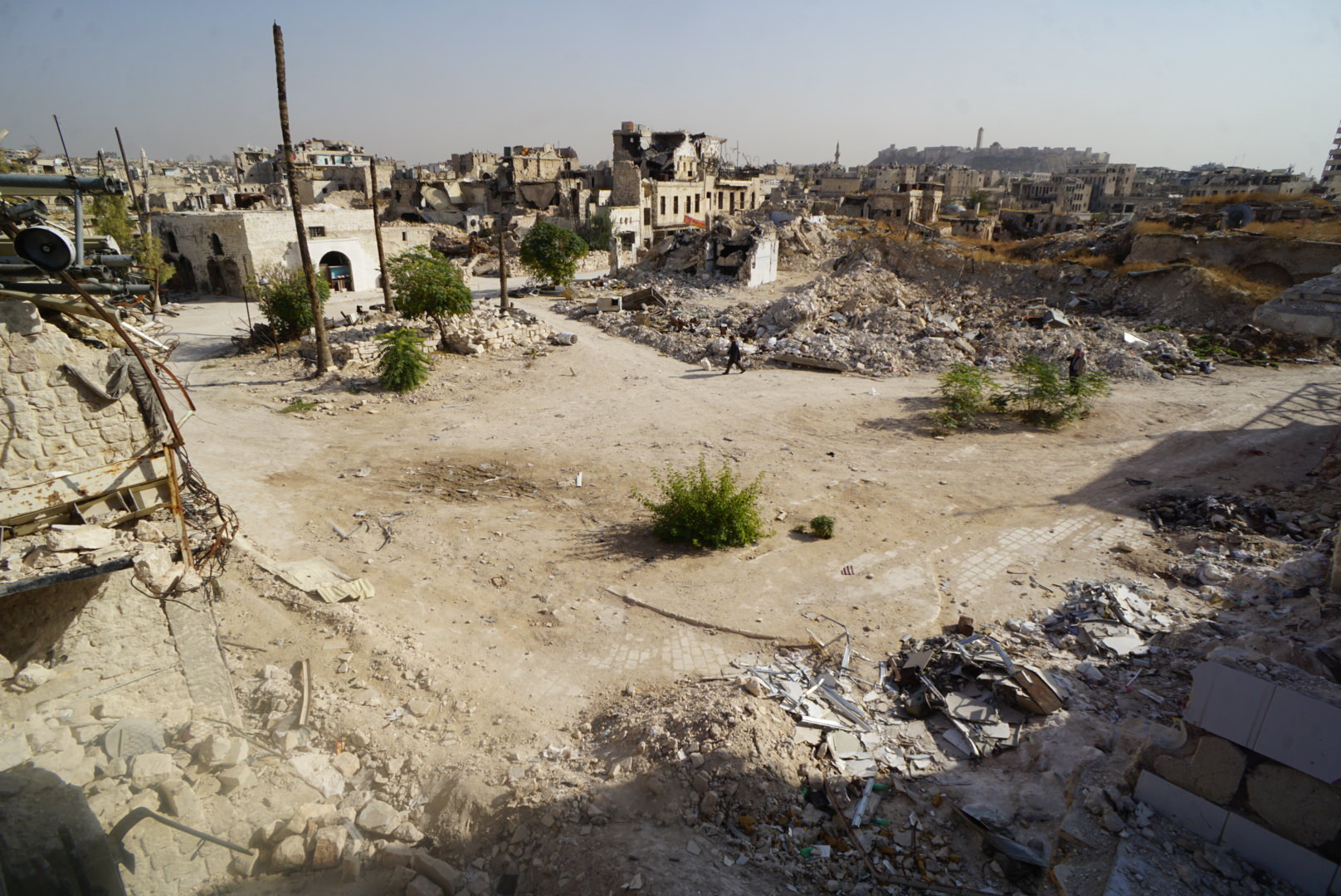
In April 2017 before removing the craters

== See also ==
- Ancient City of Aleppo
- Jdeideh (Aleppo)
- Jdeideh's Farhat Square
- Massacre of Aleppo (1850)
- Aleppo Battlefront Operations 2015 (April)
