= Waqf guardian =

The Guardian of the Waqf (Arabic: ناظر الوقف, romanized: nāẓir al-waqf) or the Custodian of the Waqf (Arabic: قيّم الوقف, romanized: ḳayyim al-waqf) is the individual responsible for managing a waqf (charitable endowment), safeguarding its assets and proceeds, and fulfilling the stipulations set forth by the founder of the waqf. Jurists unanimously agree on the obligation to adhere to the conditions stipulated by the founder regarding the appointment of the waqf's guardian. For instance, Ali ibn Abi Talib stipulated in his waqf that the guardianship would pass to his son Hasan and then to his son Husayn.

== Definition of the Guardian of the Waqf ==
- Guardian (Nazir): The term refers to the custodian, meaning the person responsible for managing a property, organization, or group of people, ensuring their welfare and overseeing their affairs.
- Guardian of the Waqf: This is the individual entrusted with managing all affairs of the waqf, either as an agent during the founder's lifetime or through a will after their death. Under Egyptian law, the guardian of the waqf is defined as a trustworthy person tasked with administering the waqf's affairs, safeguarding its assets, utilizing its properties, allocating its revenue to designated beneficiaries, fulfilling the binding conditions set by the founder, and protecting the interests of the waqf and its beneficiaries.

== Appointment of the Guardian of the Waqf ==
Jurists agree that the person entitled to the guardianship of the waqf is the one designated by the founder. Umar ibn al-Khattab stated in his endowment: "Hafsa shall manage it as long as she lives, and then those of sound judgment from her family shall take over."

In Islamic jurisprudence, if the founder has not specified a guardian, the authority to appoint a guardian falls to the judge. The judge is advised to prioritize appointing a qualified individual from among the founder's descendants or relatives. However, appointing someone outside this circle is permissible. Ibn Abidin stated: "The custodian should not be appointed from outsiders as long as there is a suitable candidate among the founder's offspring or household."

The founder may assign guardianship to themselves, to a beneficiary of the waqf, or to someone else, either by explicitly naming an individual (e.g., so-and-so) or by describing qualifications (e.g., the most prudent, the most knowledgeable, the eldest, or someone possessing a particular attribute). Whoever meets the stipulated condition is entitled to assume guardianship, following the founder's condition. Ali ibn Abi Talib, for example, stipulated that the guardianship of his waqf would pass first to his son Hasan and then to his son Husayn.

== Duties of the Guardian of the Waqf ==
The guardian of the waqf has responsibilities aimed at preserving the waqf and ensuring its proper management. These duties include:

- Preserving the waqf: Protecting its assets and maintaining its upkeep.
- Developing the waqf: Ensuring its structures are maintained or improved.
- Leasing and farming: Renting out properties or cultivating waqf lands.
- Litigating on behalf of the waqf: Defending its rights in disputes.
- Collecting its revenues: Gathering income from rents, crops, or fruits.
- Enhancing its value: Striving to grow the waqf's assets and revenues.
- Distributing income: Allocating the proceeds according to the waqf's stipulations, such as for repairs, giving to beneficiaries, or other designated purposes.

The guardian is also entrusted with the following tasks:

1. Enforcing the conditions set by the founder of the waqf.
2. Overseeing the construction, renovation, and maintenance of waqf properties.
3. Collecting the waqf's yields.
4. Distributing the revenue among the beneficiaries as per the founder's directions.
5. Investing the waqf's assets and revenues prudently to generate further income.

== Rights and Authorities of the Waqf Founder in Appointing Guardianship ==
To protect the rights and ensure the effectiveness of waqf management, Islamic jurisprudence provides specific rules for the founder's authority over the waqf. These include:

- The founder can act as the guardian during their lifetime, provided they meet the necessary qualifications. They can also appoint an agent to manage the waqf on their behalf.
- The founder has the right to designate an individual as the guardian of the waqf, whether this person is among the beneficiaries or an outsider. For example, Umar ibn al-Khattab appointed his daughter Hafsa as the guardian of his waqf, followed by senior family members, demonstrating that appointing a guardian is the founder's prerogative.
- The conditions set by the founder, such as reserving the right to lease out the waqf or other stipulations, must be respected. This is based on the jurisprudential rule: "The founder's conditions are akin to legal texts". For instance, if the founder stipulates, they have the right to lease out the waqf, this condition must be upheld.
- If the founder reserves the authority to dismiss a court-appointed guardian, or if they stipulate guardianship for themselves, they have the right to exercise this power. Al-Suyuti noted that the founder could dismiss a guardian they had appointed if they retained this authority.
- If the founder specifies that they alone, or in association with another person, have the right to manage or replace the guardian, this condition must be observed.

== Conditions for a Waqf Guardian ==
1. Islam: There is a difference of opinion among scholars regarding whether Islam is a prerequisite: The Malikis, Shafi'is, and Hanbalis require the guardian to be a Muslim, while the Hanafis do not consider Islam a necessary condition.
2. Sanity (Aql).
3. Adulthood (Bulugh).
4. Justice (Adala): The guardian should be upright and trustworthy in their religious conduct, which includes: performing obligatory acts of worship, avoiding prohibited acts and major sins, and upholding good moral character and social decorum (muruah).
5. Competence (Kifayah): The ability and strengths of the person to manage what falls under his guardianship.

== Multiple Guardians ==
It is permissible to appoint one or more guardians for a waqf. Evidence for this is drawn from the actions of Fatima bint Muhammad, who designated her husband, Ali ibn Abi Talib, as the guardian of her waqf. She stipulated that if anything happened to him, the responsibility would transfer to her two sons, Hasan and Husayn, who would jointly manage it.

== Dismissal of the Waqf Guardian ==
The founder has the right to dismiss the guardian they have appointed at any time. However, if a judge appointed the guardian due to the absence of a specific appointment by the founder, the founder cannot dismiss the judge-appointed guardian. A judge must dismiss the guardian—whether the founder or someone else—if they are dishonest or untrustworthy, incompetent or incapable of fulfilling their duties, engaged in immoral behavior (fisq), or if they are using the waqf's resources for unproductive purposes. The guardian has the right to resign, as supported by the Malikis, Hanbalis, Shafi'is, and some Hanafis views. Some scholars stipulate that resignation is only permissible if it does not cause harm to the waqf or its beneficiaries.

== Violations of the Founder's Conditions ==
Islamic scholars unanimously agree that the conditions set by the founder (waqif) for managing a waqf must be followed as long as they are valid under Sharia law. If a condition contradicts Sharia, it is not to be followed. If the founder sets specific conditions for the guardian's usage, exploitation, decision-making, or the allocation of the waqf's revenues, or stipulates themselves, a particular individual, or a specific entity as the guardian, or prioritizes their most competent offspring, such conditions must be adhered to unless exceptional circumstances necessitate otherwise. Ibn Qudamah stated: "The allocation of the waqf must adhere to the founder's conditions, and so must the appointment of its guardian."

== Cases Permitted by Scholars for Violating the Founder's Conditions ==
Violating the founder's conditions is generally considered a transgression that warrants compensation, except in cases explicitly allowed by Islamic jurists. Examples of violating the founder's conditions include:

- If the guardian uses the revenues from a mosque's waqf to purchase clothing and gives it to the needy, this is impermissible, and the guardian is liable for the misused funds.
- If the waqf is designated for the maintenance of a mosque, the funds cannot be used to purchase oil, mats, decorations, or railings. If such expenses are incurred, the guardian is liable.
- The scholars outlined specific scenarios where violating the founder's conditions is permissible. The Hanafis identified seven such cases:
1. If the founder stipulates that the judge cannot dismiss the guardian, the judge is still permitted to dismiss an unfit guardian.
2. If the founder prohibits leasing the waqf for more than one year but leasing for a longer period benefits the poor or aligns with prevailing practices, the judge—not the guardian—may override this condition.
3. If the founder requires recitation over their grave, this condition is void based on the opinion that reciting at graves is disliked, though the prevailing view permits it.
4. If the founder prohibits replacing the waqf property with another, this condition may be overridden if necessary.
5. Suppose the founder specifies that excess revenue should be distributed to beggars in a particular mosque. In that case, the guardian may distribute it to beggars in another mosque, outside a mosque, or even to non-beggars.
6. If the founder mandates specific daily provisions of bread and meat for the beneficiaries, the guardian may choose to provide the value in cash instead, with the beneficiaries having the final choice.
7. The judge may increase the stipulated salary of an imam if it is insufficient, provided the imam is knowledgeable and pious.

== The State's Authority over Waqf ==
The state's authority over waqf has both legal and religious foundations, supported by Sharia principles and legal provisions that ensure the state's right and responsibility to oversee waqf properties. This oversight serves as a means to reform and regulate waqf operations, ensuring that the intended benefits are achieved in the best possible manner.

The state's authority over waqf is based on credible Sharia evidence derived from the Quran, Sunnah, and consensus (ijma'). For example, the Quran says "Indeed, Allah commands you to render trusts to whom they are due and when you judge between people to judge with justice" (Surah An-Nisa: 58). It also said, "And do not approach the property of the orphan, except in a way that is best" (Surah Al-An'am: 152). Also in the Hadith narrated by Abu Ya'la Ma'qil ibn Yasar, Muhammad said: "No servant whom Allah places in a position of authority over others and dies in a state of deceiving them shall enter Paradise." (Reported by Bukhari and Muslim).

Islamic scholars have unanimously agreed, from the time of Muhammad to the present day, that trusts must be fulfilled, and failing to do so is prohibited. One of the most significant trusts is the state's responsibility over waqf. Ibn Taymiyyah commented: "Muslims have agreed that authority is a trust that must be fulfilled. For instance, the guardian of an orphan, the overseer of a waqf, and a man's agent in managing his property must act in the most beneficial and appropriate way."

== Scope of the State's Authority over Waqf ==
The scope of the state's authority over waqf is defined by the activities it undertakes within this framework. Upon examining these activities, they can be categorized into three primary areas:

1. Direct Administration of Waqf.
2. Administrative and Sharia Oversight over Guardians: This includes:
  - Monitoring the performance and decisions of waqf overseers (nadhirs).
  - Supervising the overseers' expenditures related to waqf properties and holding them accountable.
  - Observing the personal conduct of the overseers and removing them from their positions if necessary.
3. Criminal Protection of Waqf: The state ensures the protection of waqf properties against violations, fraud, or misuse by establishing laws and enforcement mechanisms to safeguard them.

== Challenges of State Authority over Waqf ==
The challenges associated with the state's authority over waqf stem from its alignment with the state's public policies, which can cause waqf management to be influenced by these policies. The main challenges can be summarized as follows:

1. The state prioritizes its public policies at the expense of effectively managing waqf properties.
2. Misallocation of waqf revenues.
3. Greed for the financial resources of waqf.
4. Neglect of waqf's national role.
5. Lack of clear policies for holding waqf overseers (nadhirs) accountable.
6. Weak punitive measures for criminal protection.
7. Imbalance in the management and treatment of waqf properties.

== Solutions to the Challenges of State Authority over Waqf ==
To address these challenges, the following solutions are proposed:

1. Highlighting the developmental role of waqf and its impact on the nation's progress.
2. Activating the implementation of Sharia-based rulings that regulate waqf.
3. Legislative reforms to respect the intentions of waqf founders (waqif).
4. Strengthening oversight over waqf management.
5. Establishing dedicated bodies for Sharia oversight of waqf.
6. Adopting the principle of collective management (nazarah jama'iyyah) for waqf properties.
7. Learning from successful waqf reform experiences in the Arab world.
8. Granting waqf the status of public funds.
9. Enhancing the enforcement of penalties in criminal and civil responsibilities.
10. Enacting legislative measures to encourage the establishment of new waqf properties.

== See also ==
- Central Waqf Council (India)
- Jerusalem Islamic Waqf
- Charitable trust
- Islamic economic jurisprudence
- Islamic economics in the world
- Private foundation
- Trust law
- Zakah
- Waqf of Ibshir Mustafa Pasha Complex
- AWQAF Africa
- Haryana Waqf Board (India)
- Ministry of Awqaf (Egypt)
- Office of the Waqf Administrator (Bangladesh)
