= Abu Abdo =

Restaurant in Aleppo, Syria

Coordinates: 36.207572°N 37.157984°E

Abu Abdo al-Fawwal (Arabic: أبو عبدو) is a ful parlor located in Aleppo, Syria. The shop was established in 1885 by Abdel Razzaq "Abu Abdo" al-Masri at al-Hatab Square, near the Zamaria house in the Jdeydeh Quarter of the Ancient City of Aleppo.

The parlor is famous for levantine and Aleppo style fūl dishes. Usually, the fava beans are left simmering in large copper jars throughout the night, to be served from the next morning on; the beans swim in tahini and olive oil, completed with a hint of red pepper paste over the top.

The shop is one of the oldest and most famous parlors in Aleppo.

In 2013 the shop was severely damaged during the clashes between the Syrian Army and the militants of the armed opposition. The shop has been relocated to a nearby street since late August 2012.

== Notable guests ==
Many famous natives of Aleppo or guests have visited the parlor: including Sayed Darwish, Umm Kulthum, Farid al-Atrash, Sabah Fakhri, Adel Emam, Muhammad Naji al-Otari, Hasan Dakkak, Ahmet Davutoğlu and President Bashar al-Assad.

== Gallery ==
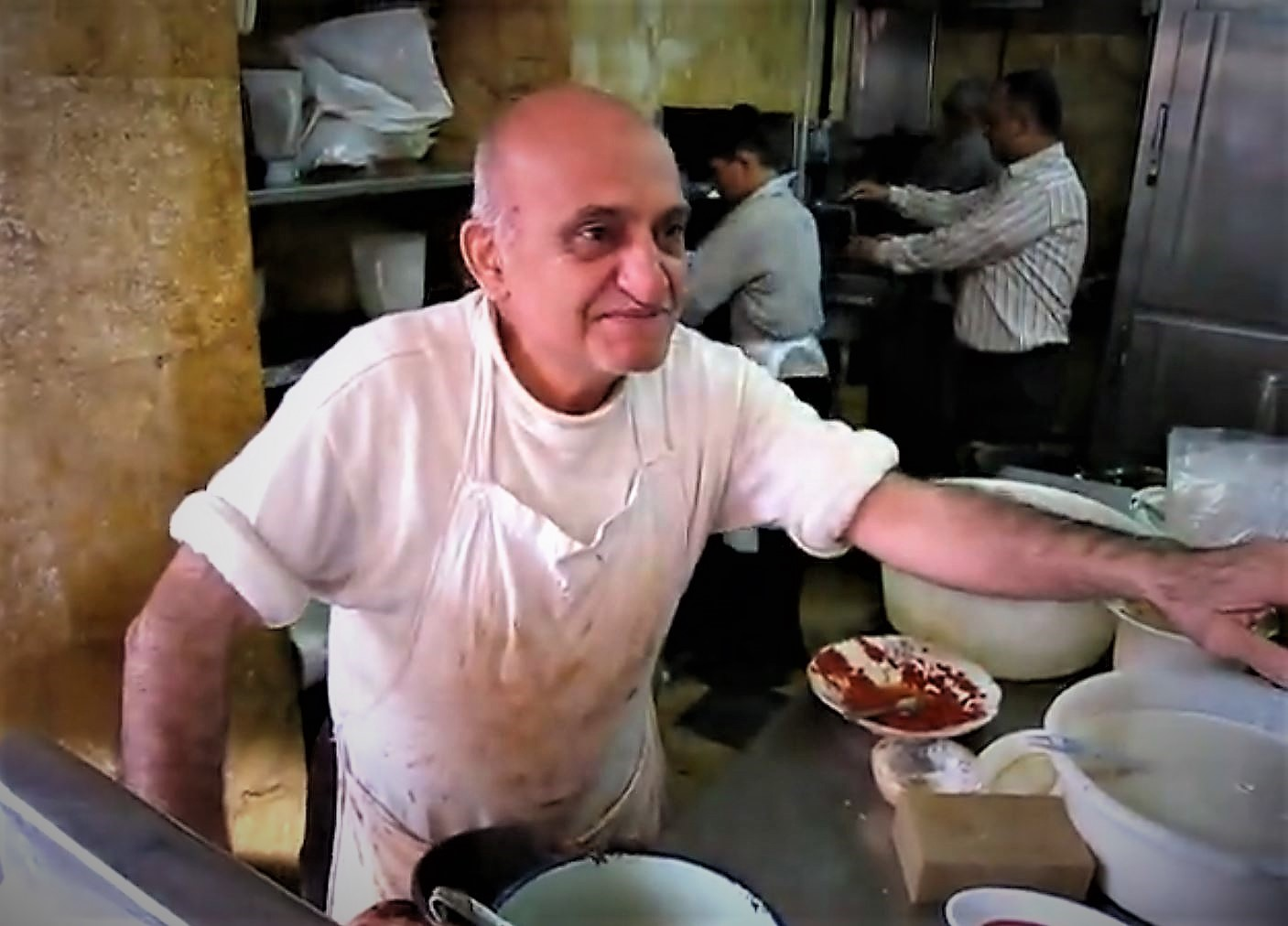
Abu Abdo has been making ful medammes for over fifty years in the Al-Jdayde (Jdeideh) District of Aleppo.

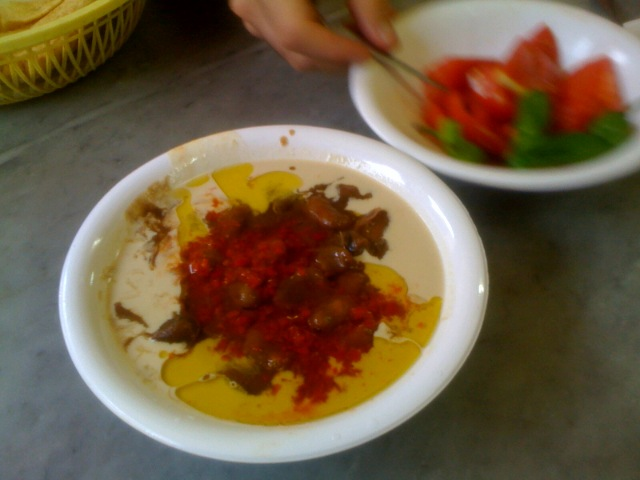
Fûl Müdemmis made in the pure Aleppine style
