= Nazir (title) =

The Arabic title nāẓir (ناظر, Turkish: nazır) refers to an overseer in a general sense. In Islam, it is the normal term for the administrator of a waqf (charitable endowment). The office or territory of a nāẓir is a nazirate.

According to al-Qābisī, writing in the tenth century, the pagan ruler of Tadmakka appointed a superintendent, which al-Qābisī calls a nāẓir, from among the Muslims living in his land to oversee them. This was probably a common arrangement in the Sahara and Sahel regions.

The title was used in Egypt for the heads of government departments and agencies before it adopted a modern cabinet system. It was synonymous with inspector, supervisor or controller. In Egypt it may also be used for the directors or managers of commercial enterprises.

In the Anglo-Egyptian Sudan, the title nāẓir al-khuṭṭ was used for the official in charge of a subdivision of a district. Usually he was a tribal head. Nāẓir ʿumūm was a traditional and usually hereditary Sudanese title for the head of a tribal confederation. It was only infrequently recognised by the Anglo-Egyptian government, but it was used for lower-level salaried officials in the Jazīra. As a traditional Sudanese title, nāẓir may be an Arabic rendering of the originally Funj titles mānjil and manfona. One of the nāẓir's duties was to administer uncultivated land (qifār) within the tribal homeland (dār).
