= Waqf of Ibshir Mustafa Pasha Complex =

Waqf of Ibshir Mustafa Pasha
- وقف ابشير باشا (Arabic)
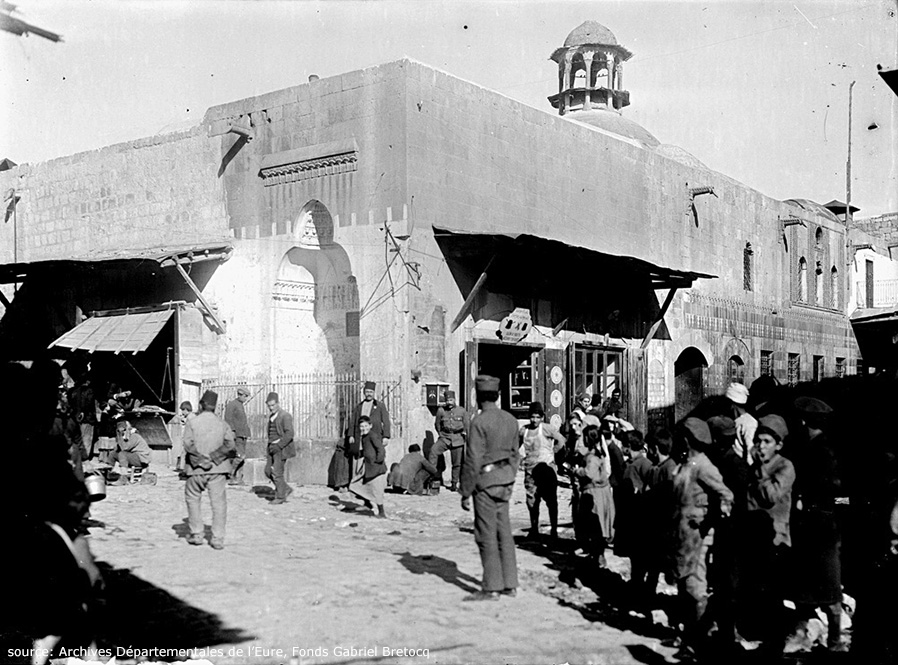
- Water fountain of the Waqf Ibshir Mustafa Pasha Complex

- Location within Aleppo
- 36°12′23.2″N 37°09′25.4″E
- Location: Al-Jdayde, Aleppo, Syria

History
- Built: 1652

The Waqf of Ibshir Mustafa Pasha (AR: وقف ابشير باشا) is a sizeable 17th century endowment complex built by wazir Ipshir Mustafa Pasha in 1652 who was then governor of Aleppo. It has been described as of the largest and most interesting building complexes to be erected in Aleppo during Ottoman times.

== Background ==
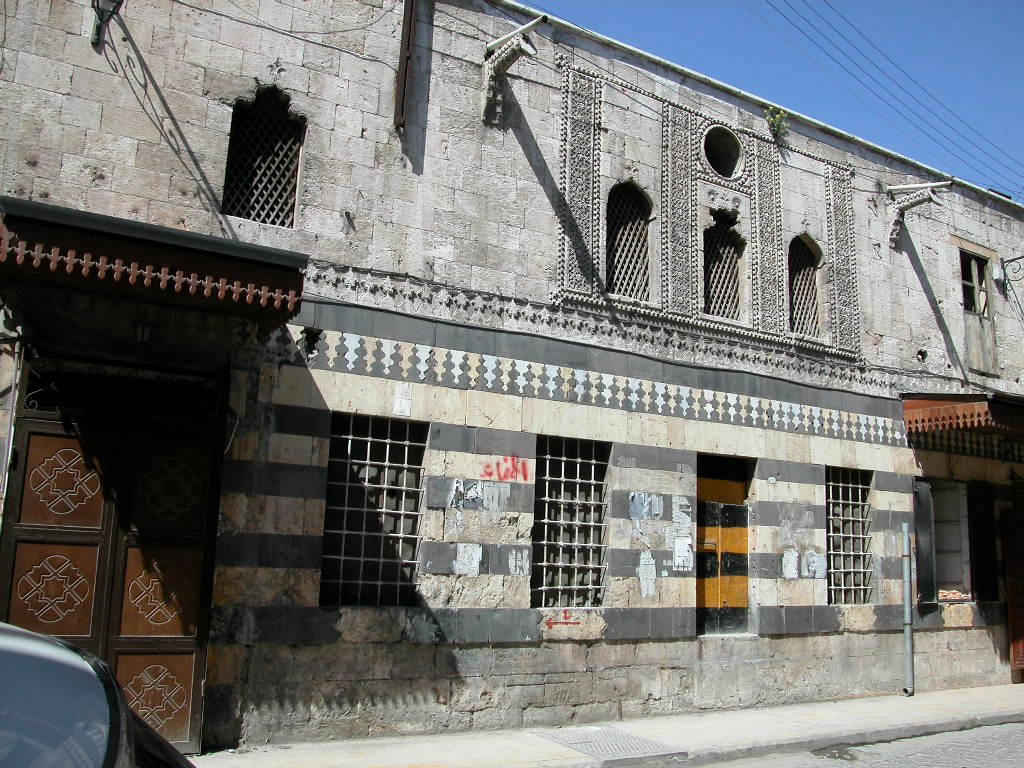
Part of facade of the Waqf of Ibshir Mustafa Pasha Complex

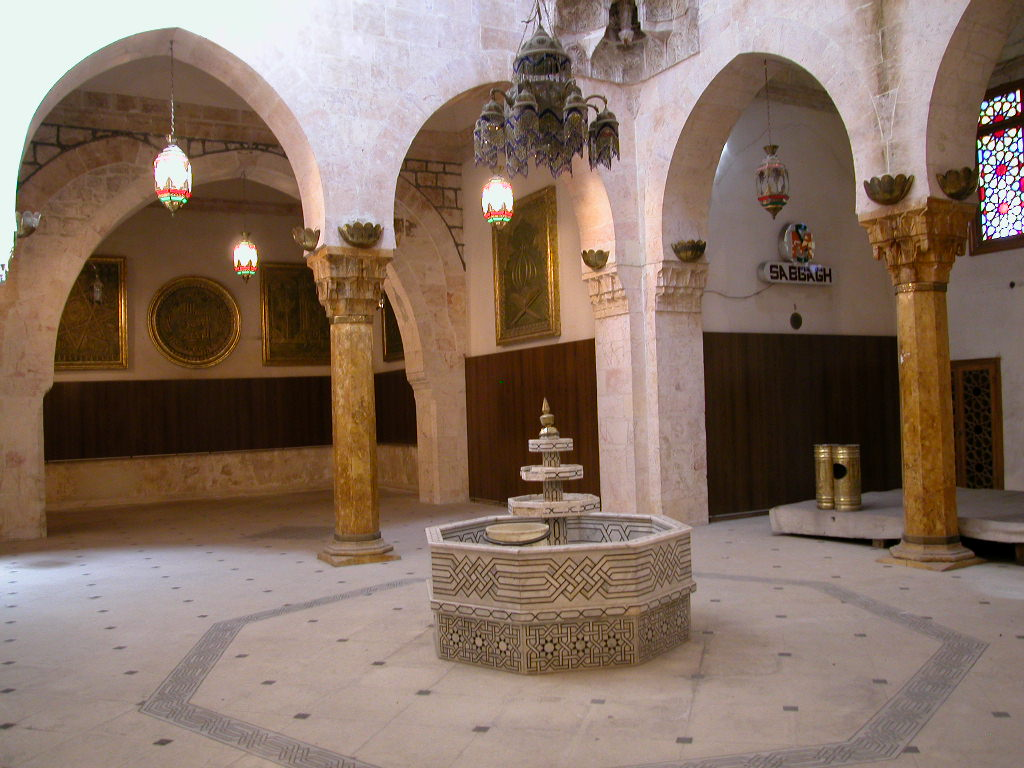
The coffee room interior after restoration

The Ibshir Mustafa Pasha Waqf complex is one of a number of notable historic structures built in 17th century Aleppo. The complex included a khan, three qaysariyya, textile looms and dye workshop, a souk, bread ovens, a sebil and a coffee-house noted for its fine decorations. The qaysariyyas in this area of Aleppo specialized in textile manufacturing. They were active until the late 20th century.

The Bahram Pasha waqf hammam's lies in an adjacent building. They provided a shared 'public' space and commercial opportunity for local Christian and Muslim inhabitants and led to its neighbourhood of Al-Jdayde to become Aleppo's second economic centre. Aleppo's Beit Ghazaleh and Beit Ajikbash museums lie adjacent to the waqf complex.

The coffeehouse hall of the waqf complex of Ibshir Mustafa Pasha is one of the largest non-commercially used spaces of Ottoman Aleppo.

== Recent developments ==
View over the waqf complex of Ibshir Pasha and Bahram Pasha Hammam taken in September 2017

The complex suffered damage from street fighting and intermittent shelling throughout Syria's civil war. In particular, a series of underground explosions that occurred in April 2015 devastated the building and surrounding area. The elaborate facade of the hall of the coffee-house, as well as its first row of vaults, were destroyed during the war.

The waqf complex is listed as one of 25 most significant restoration sites proposed for the Ancient City of Aleppo.

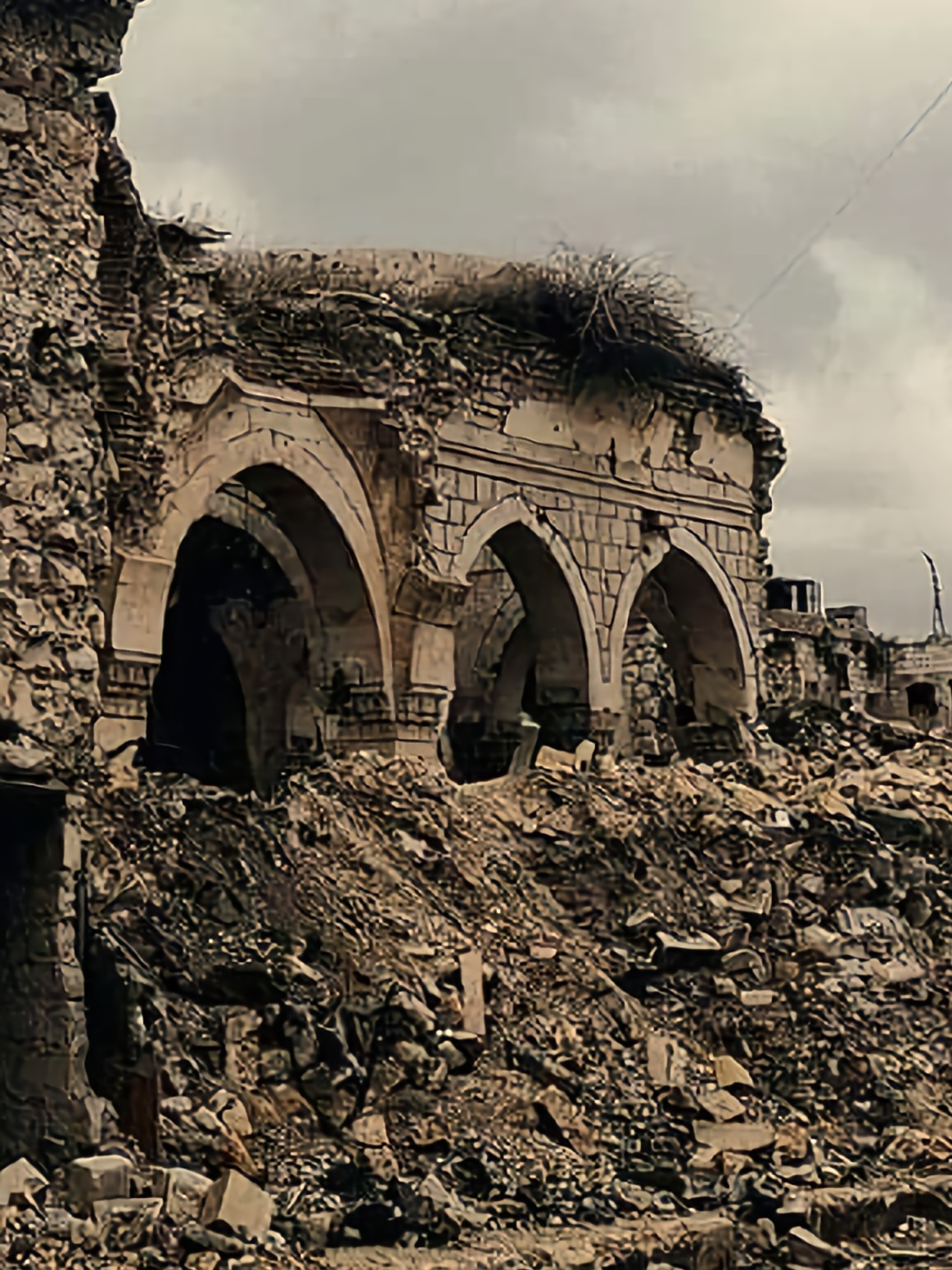
Survey photo showing damage to the coffee room

== Gallery ==
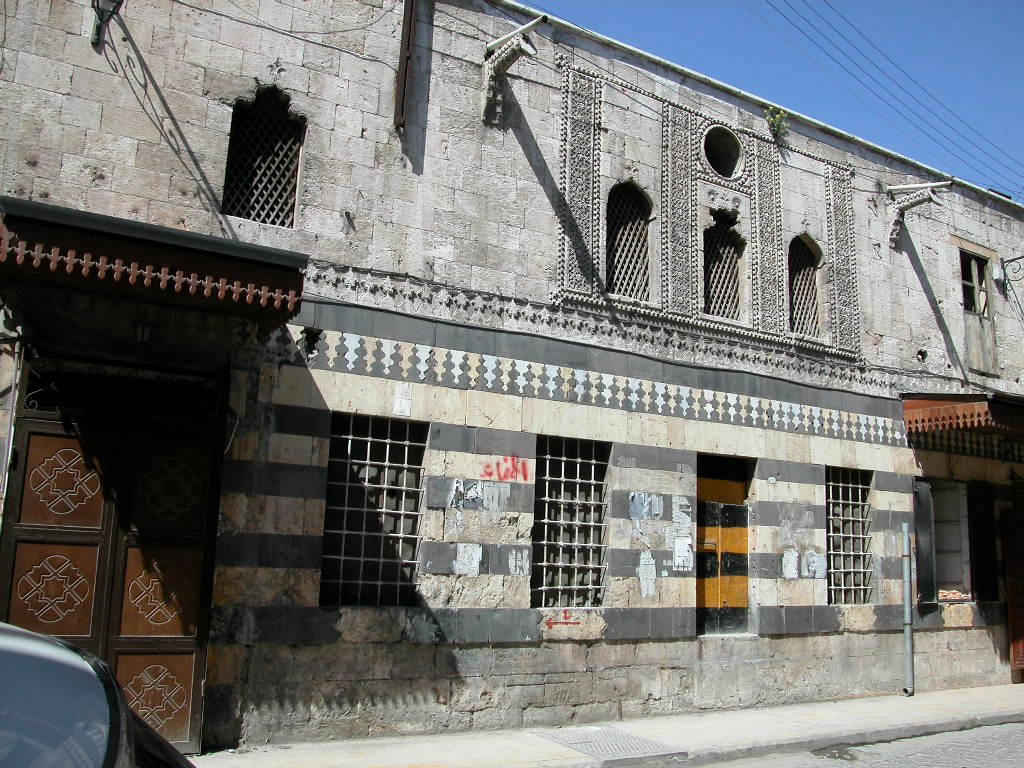
Facade of Waqf Cafe

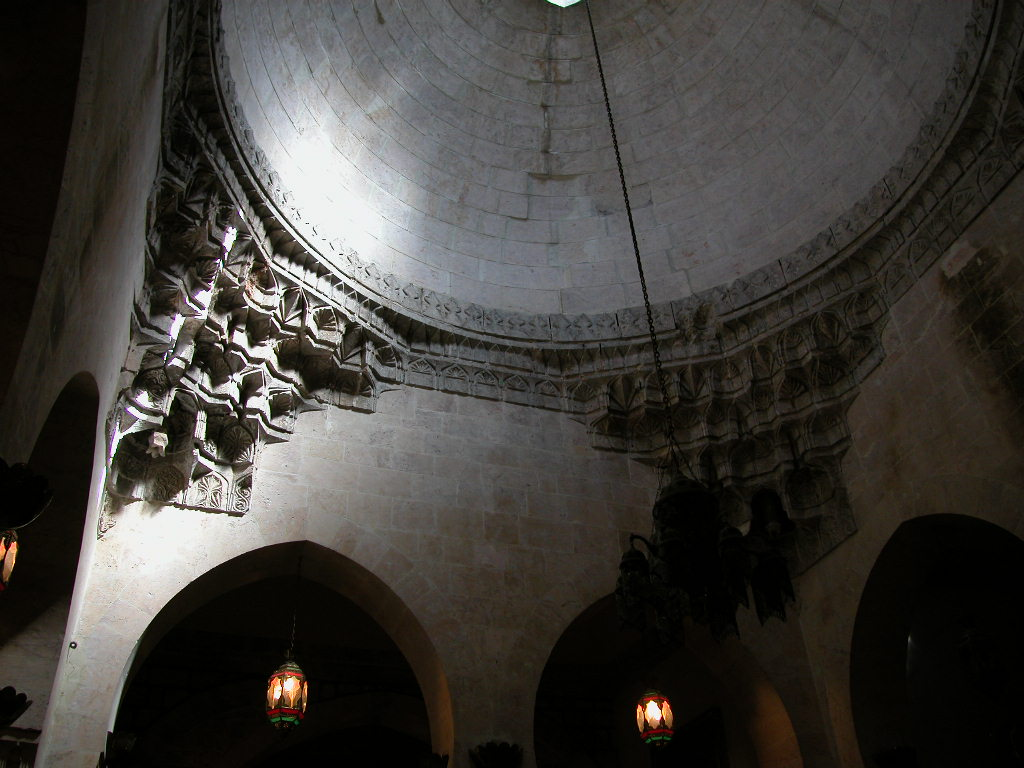
Dome of Waqf Cafe

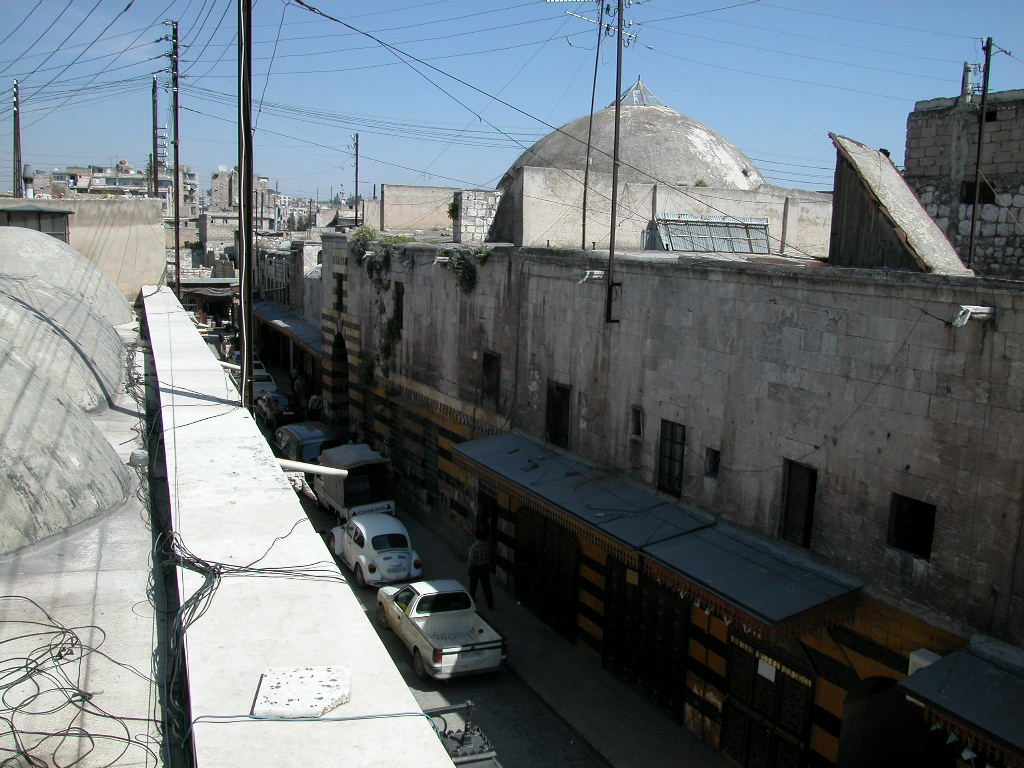
Rooftop view over Waqf Hammam

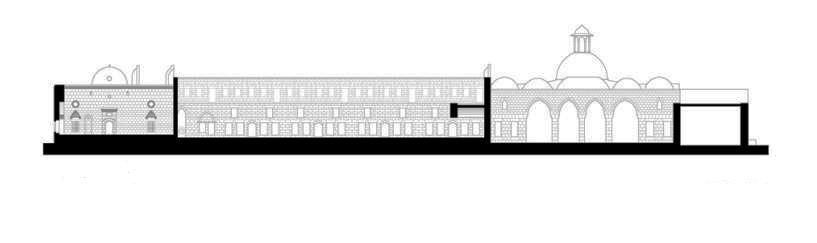
Outline drawing of the Waqf Complex of Ibshir Pasha in Aleppo

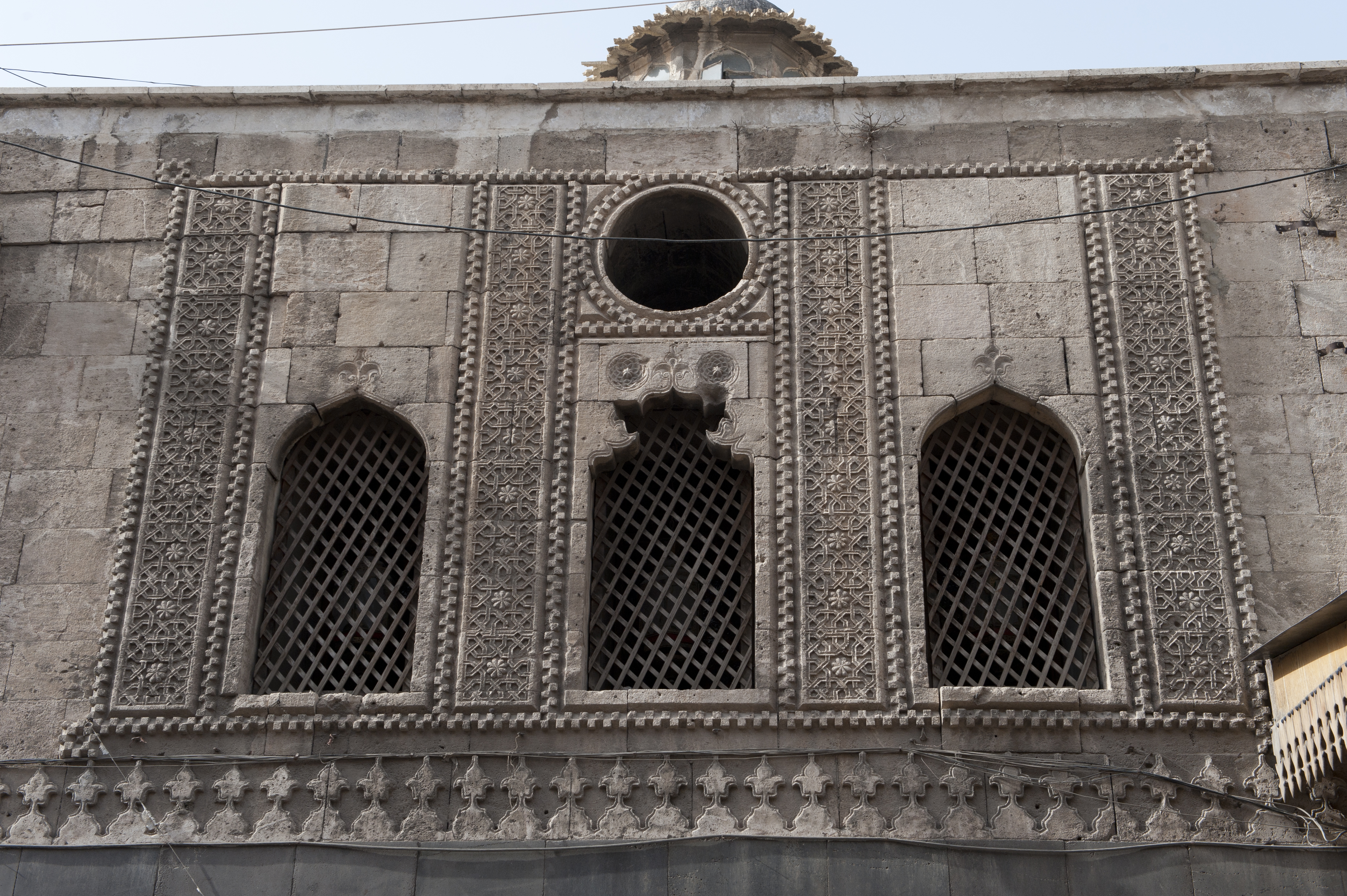
Facade of the Waqf Complex of Ibshir Pasha in Aleppo's Jdeidah district
