= Abil =

Abil آبل Abel
- Village
- Location in Syria
- Coordinates: 34°38′14″N 36°40′34″E
- Country: Syria
- Governorate: Homs
- District: Homs
- Subdistrict: Homs

Population (2004)
  - Total: 2,873
- Time zone: UTC+3 (AST)

Abil (Arabic: آبل, also spelled Abel or Aabel) is a village in central Syria, administratively part of the Homs Governorate, located 10 kilometers south of Homs. Nearby localities include al-Nuqayrah and Kafr Aya to the north, Maskanah to the northeast, Judaydat al-Sharqiyah to the east, Shinshar to the southeast, Damina al-Sharqiyah to the south, al-Buwaydah al-Sharqiyah to the southwest and Qattinah to the west. According to the Syria Central Bureau of Statistics (CBS), Abil had a population of 2,873 in the 2004 census. Its inhabitants are predominantly Sunni Muslims.

Abil is identified the Roman era settlement of Abila Lysaniae. The medieval Syrian geographer Yaqut al-Hamawi visited the village in the 1220s, noting it was "A village of Hims, lying near the city, to the south, and about 2 miles distant."

== Bibliography ==
- Lipinsky, Edward (2000). The Aramaeans: Their Ancient History, Culture, Religion. Peeters Publishers. ISBN 9042908599.
- Smith, Eli; Robinson, Edward (1841). Biblical Researches in Palestine, Mount Sinai and Arabia Petraea: A Journal of Travels in the Year 1838. Vol. 3. Crocker and Brewster.
- le Strange, Guy (1890). Palestine Under the Moslems: A Description of Syria and the Holy Land from A.D. 650 to 1500. Committee of the Palestine Exploration Fund.
