= Al-Naqirah =

Al-Naqirah النقيرة Al-Nuqayrah
- Village
- Location in Syria
- Coordinates: 34°39′52″N 36°40′3″E
- Country: Syria
- Governorate: Homs
- District: Homs
- Subdistrict: Homs

Population (2004)
  - Total: 2,025
- Time zone: UTC+3 (AST)

Al-Naqirah (Arabic: النقيرة, also spelled al-Nuqayrah) is a village in central Syria, administratively part of the Homs Governorate, located south of Homs. Nearby localities include Kafr Aya to the northeast, Maskanah to the west, Abil to the south, Qattinah to the southwest and Tell al-Shur to the west.

According to the Syria Central Bureau of Statistics (CBS), al-Naqirah had a population of 2,025 in the 2004 census. Its inhabitants are predominantly Sunni Muslims.
