= Homs =

City in western Syria, ancient Emesa

Homs حمص
- City
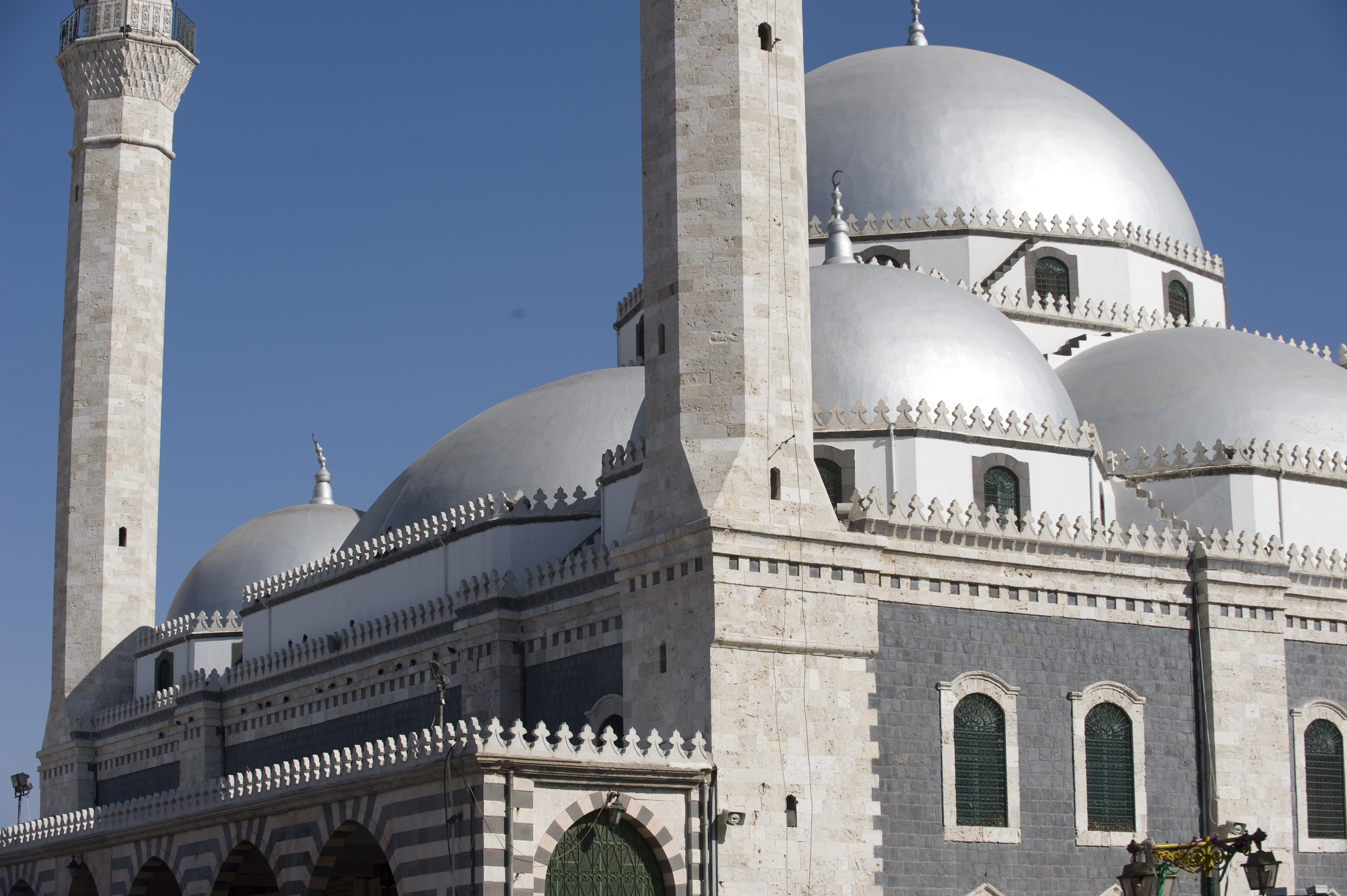
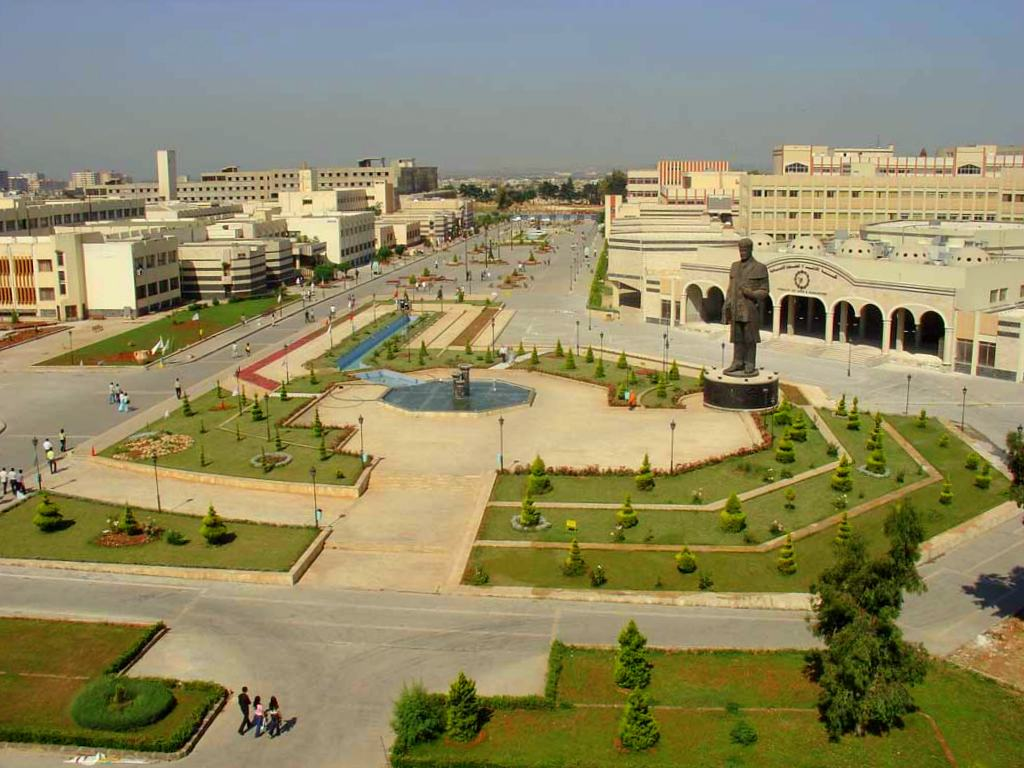
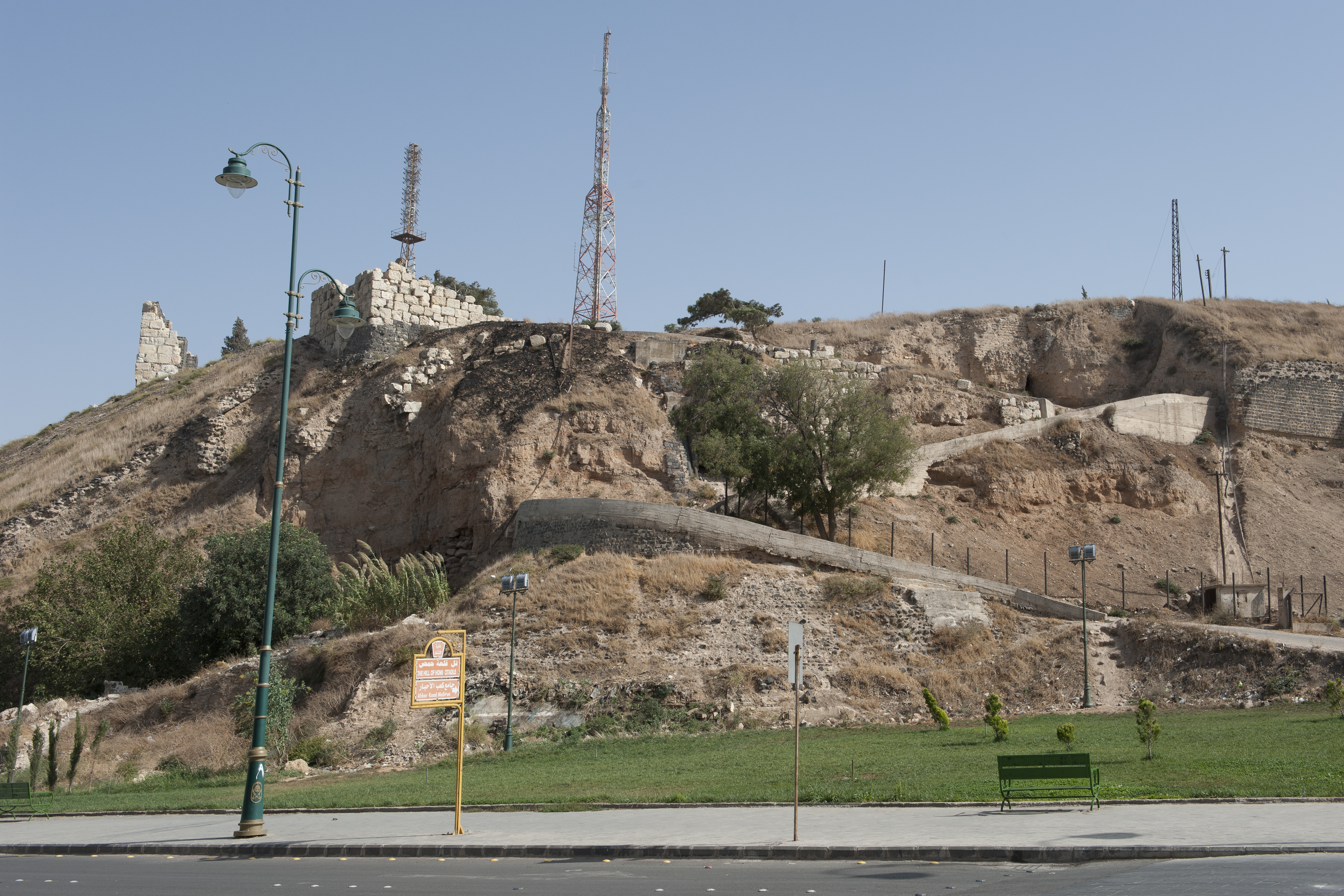
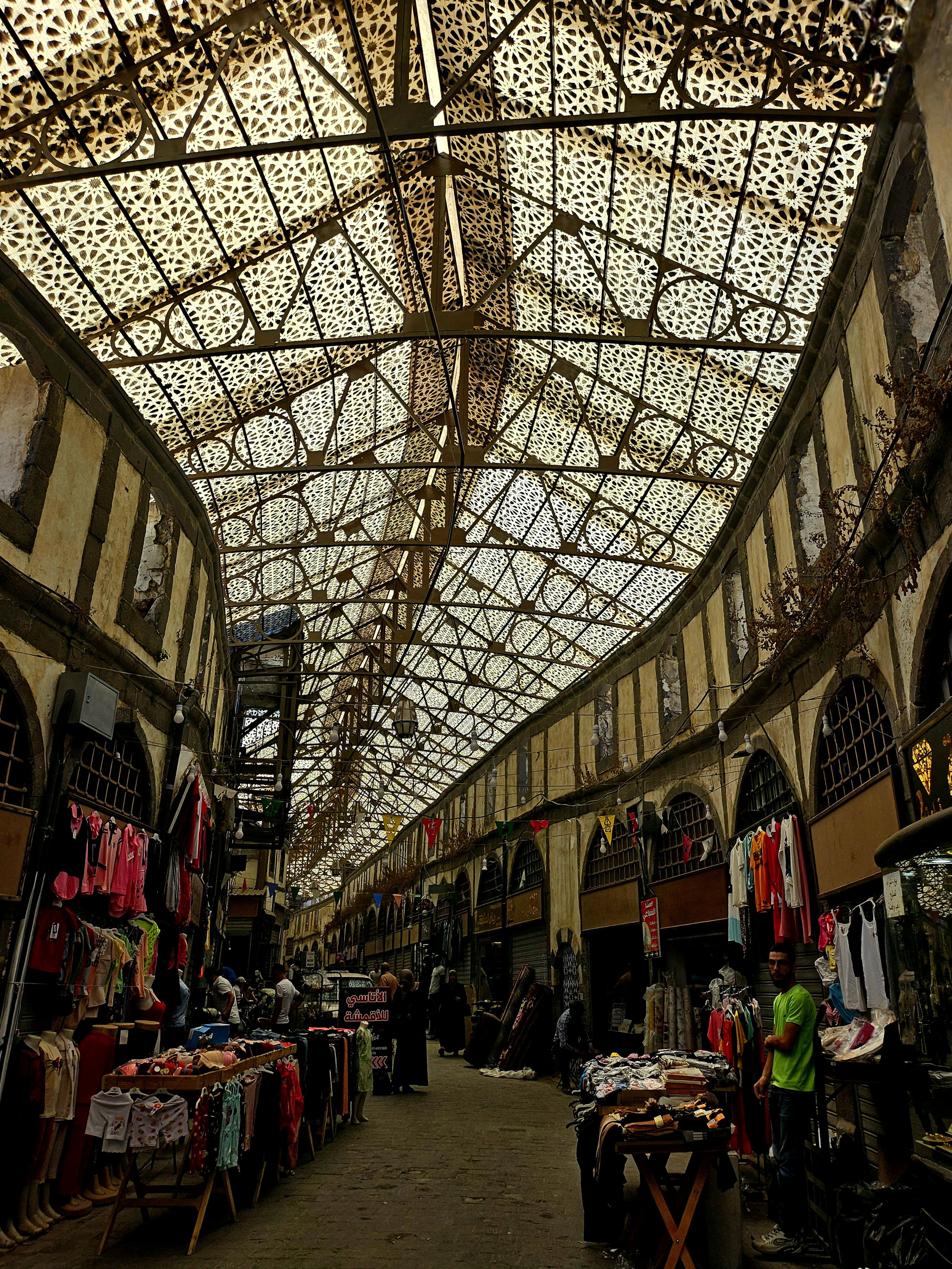
- Martyrs' Square with the Old Clock Khalid ibn al-Walid Mosque Homs University Remains of the Citadel of Homs Al-Masqouf Souk
- Nicknames: Mother of the black stones (أم الحجار السود) al-ʻAdhīyah (الْعَذِيَّة) (Note: Meaning a fertile land far from the water, scourge and pestilence.); The city of Ibn Al-Walid (مدينة ابن الوليد); The House of Peace (دار السلام)
- Interactive map of Homs
- Location in Syria Homs (Eastern Mediterranean) Homs (Asia)
- Coordinates: 34°43′51″N 36°42′34″E
- Country: Syria
- Governorate: Homs Governorate
- District: Homs District
- Subdistrict: Homs Subdistrict
- First settled: 2000BC

Government
  - Mayor: Brigadier General Marhaf Al-Naasan

Area
  - City: 48 km^{2} (19 sq mi)
  - Urban: 76 km^{2} (29 sq mi)
  - Metro: 104 km^{2} (40 sq mi)
- Elevation: 501 m (1,644 ft)

Population (2017, est.)
  - City: 775,404
  - Density: 16,000/km^{2} (42,000/sq mi)
- Demonyms: English: Homsi; Arabic: حمصي, romanized: Himsi
- Time zone: UTC+3 (AST)
- Area codes: Country code: 963; City code: 31
- Geocode: C2528
- Climate: Csa
- Website: homscitycouncil.gov.sy

Homs, (Note: English pronunciation: UK: /hɒms/ HOMSS, US: /hɔːms, hɔːmz, hʊms/ HAWMSS, HAWMZ, HUUMSS; Arabic: حِمْص, romanized: Ḥimṣ [ħɪmsˤ]; Syrian Arabic: حُمْص, romanized: Ḥumṣ [ħɔmsˤ].) known in pre-Islamic times as Emesa, (Note: English: /ˈɛməsə/ EM-ə-sə; Ancient Greek: Ἔμεσα, romanized: Émesa.) is a city in western Syria and the capital of the Homs Governorate. It is 501 m (1,644 ft) above sea level and is located 162 km (101 mi) north of Damascus. Located on the Orontes River, Homs is also the central link between the interior cities and the Mediterranean coast.

Before the Syrian civil war, Homs was a major industrial hub with a population of at least 652,609 people in 2004, it was the third-largest city in Syria after Aleppo to the north and the capital Damascus to the south. Its population reflected Syria's general religious diversity, composed of Sunni and Alawite Muslims, and Christians. There are a number of historic mosques and churches in the city, and it is close to the Krak des Chevaliers castle, a World Heritage Site.

Homs did not emerge into the historical record until the 1st century BC in the Seleucid Empire, becoming the capital of a kingdom ruled by the Emesene dynasty who gave the city its name. Originally a center of worship for El-Gabal, a pagan idol linked to the sun, it later gained importance in Christianity under the Byzantines. Homs was conquered by the Muslims in the 7th century and made capital of a district that bore its current name. Throughout the Islamic era, Muslim dynasties contending for control of Syria sought after Homs due to the city's strategic position in the area. Homs began to decline under the Ottomans and only in the 19th century did the city regain its economic importance when its cotton industry boomed. During French Mandate rule, the city became a center of insurrection and, after independence in 1946, a center of Baathist resistance to the first Syrian governments.

During the civil war, much of the city was devastated due to the Siege of Homs; reconstruction to affected parts of the city is underway. In December 2024, Syrian rebels began an offensive, entering Homs and taking control of the city on December 8.

== Etymology ==
The city's modern name is an Arabic form of the city's Latin name Emesus, derived from the Greek Émesa or Émesos, or Hémesa.

Most sources claim that the name Emesa in turn derived from the name of the nomadic Arab tribe known in Greek as Emesenoi, who inhabited the region prior to Roman influence in the area. Émesa was shortened to Homs or Hims by its Arab inhabitants, many of whom settled there prior to the Muslim conquest of Syria.

Other sources claim that the name Émesa or Hémesa was derived from that of the Aramean city of Hamath-zobah, a combination of Hamath (Hebrew: חֲמָת, romanized: Ḥamāth; Syriac: ܚܡܬ, romanized: Ḥmṭ; "fortress") and Sawbah (Hebrew: צובָא; Syriac: ܨܘܒܐ Ṣwba; "nearness"). Thus, the name collectively means "The fortress surrounding" which refers to the Citadel of Homs and the encircling plains.

The city was subsequently referred to as Χέμψ (Khémps) in Medieval Greek, and as "la Chamelle" (literally meaning "the female camel" in French but likely a corruption of the Arabic name according to René Dussaud) by the Crusaders (e.g. William of Tyre, Historia, 7.12, 21.6), although they never ruled the city.

== History ==
For approximately 2,000 years, Homs has served as a key agricultural market, production site and trade centre for the villages of northern Syria. It has also provided security services to the hinterland of Syria, protecting it from invading forces. Excavations at the Citadel of Homs indicate that the earliest settlement at the site dates back to around 2300 BCE. Biblical scholars have identified the city with Hamath-zobah of Zobah mentioned in the Bible. In 1274 BCE, a battle took place between the forces of the Egyptian Empire under Ramesses II and the Hittite Empire under Muwatalli II at the city of Kadesh on the Orontes River near Homs. It was possibly the largest chariot battle ever fought, involving perhaps 5,000–6,000 chariots.

=== Emesene dynasty and Roman rule ===
Strabo only mentioned Arethusa in his Geography, as a "very strong place" of the Arab Sampsigeramos and of his son Iamblikhos, "phylarchs" of the Emesene, who had allied themselves to Q. Caecilius Bassus against Caesar in 47 BC; the translators above cited have thought strange Strabo's not saying a word about Emesa. Claims have been made that Emesa was founded by Seleucus I Nicator who established the Seleucid Empire upon the death of Alexander the Great. However, according to Henri Seyrig, Emesa does not seem to have received any Greek colony and the authors' complete silence makes one think that it did not increase its visibility under the Seleucid kings. According to Henri Seyrig, it even seems that Posidonius, to whom Strabo probably referred concerning the Emesenes' phylarchs' alliance with Q. Caecilius Bassus, regarded the Emesenes as a simple tribe, governed by its sheikhs, and still devoid of a real urban existence; (Note: According to J. L. Whitaker, "Strabo seems to consider these Emesani to be among the tribes of tent dwellers (skénitai) who dwelt in the region south of Apamea".) according to Maamoun Abdulkarim, occupation of the citadel's tell does not confirm the existence of a real urban centre in the plain before the Roman period and recent excavations have refuted the existence of vestiges preceding the Roman period under the actual town's outline, and the existence of an Arab Emesene dynasty in the region, probably located in Arethusa, attests to the secondary nature of this area during the Hellenistic period. Upon Pompey's submission of the Seleucid state of Syria to the Roman Republic in 64 BCE, the Emesene dynasty were confirmed in their rule as client kings of the Romans for aiding their troops in various wars. At its greatest extent, the Arab kingdom's boundaries extended from the Bekaa Valley in the west to the border with Palmyra in the east, and from Yabrud in the south to al-Rastan (Arethusa) in the north. A marker at the Palmyrene's southwestern border was found in 1936 by Daniel Schlumberger at Qasr al-Hayr al-Gharbi, dating from the reign of Hadrian or one of his successors, which marked the boundary between Palmyrene and Emesene (Note: Inscription reproduced: Fin[es] inteṛ Hadriano[s] Palmyrenos et [He]ṃesenos) (Pliny the Elder asserted that both territories were contiguous); this boundary probably ran northwards to Khirbet al-Bilaas on Jabal al-Bilas where another marker, laid by Roman governor Silanus, has been found, 75 kilometres (47 mi) northwest of Palmyra, probably marking a boundary with the territory of Epiphania. The kingdom of Sampsiceramus I, was the first of Rome's Arab clients on the desert fringes.

The Emesa helmet found in the necropolis of Tell Abu Sabun. Its owner was likely buried in the first half of the 1st century AD

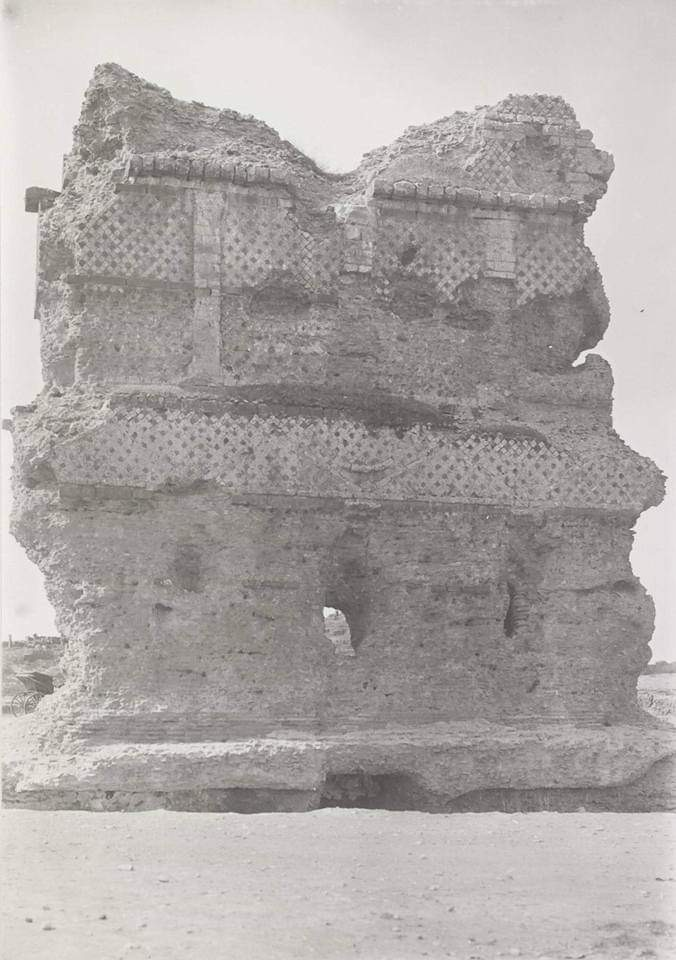
The Tomb of Sampsigeramus, photographed 1907; it may have been built in 78–79 by a relative of the Emesene dynasty

The city of Emesa grew to prominence after the new-found wealth of the Emesene dynasty, governed first by one of the sons of Sampsiceramus I, Iamblichus I who made it the kingdom's capital. The Emesene proved their loyalty to Rome once more when they aided Gaius Julius Caesar in his siege of Alexandria in 48 BC, by sending him army detachments. Subsequently, they became embroiled in the Roman Civil War between the rebelling Mark Antony and the pro-Caesar Octavian. Iamblichus I took the side of Octavian, and so upon encouragement from Antony, Iamblichus's brother Alexander usurped the throne and put Iamblichus I to death in 31 BCE. Octavian's forces prevailed in the war, however, and as a result the kingdom's throne was reverted to Iamblichus II (the son of Iamblichus I) after Alexander was executed for treason. It was in 32 that Heliopolis and the Beqaa Valley came under the kingdom's control. Relations with the Roman government grew closer when King Sohaemus inherited the kingship. Under him, Emesa sent the Roman military a regular levy of archers and assisted them in their siege of Jerusalem in 70. Sohaemus had died in 73. According to Maurice Sartre, the dynasty was very likely deprived of its kingdom, which was annexed to the Roman province of Syria, between 72 and the date of the construction of the Tomb of Sampsigeramus (78–79).

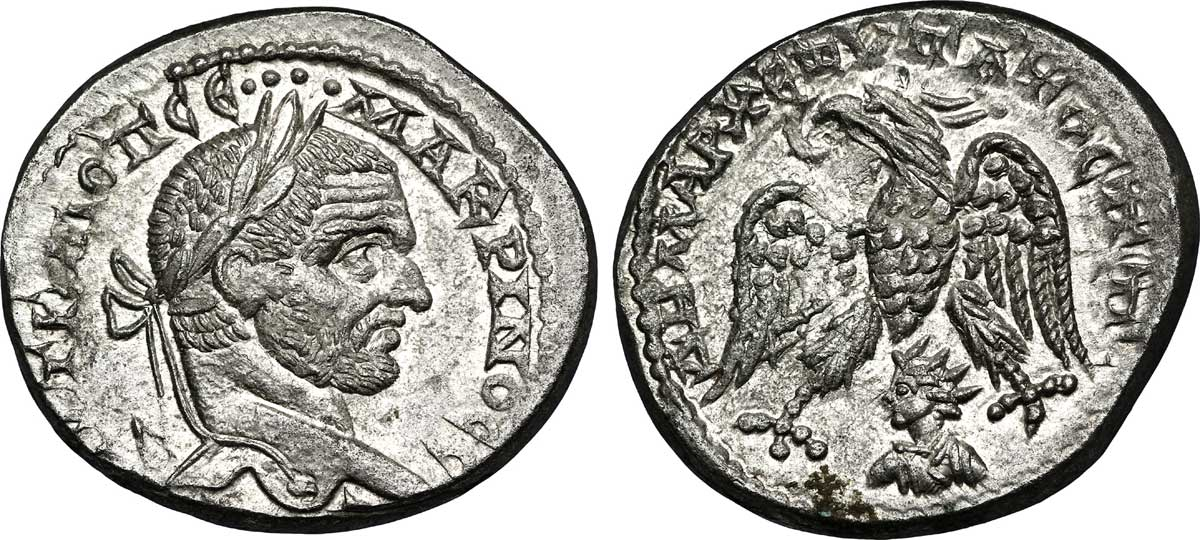
Coin minted by Macrinus in Emesa

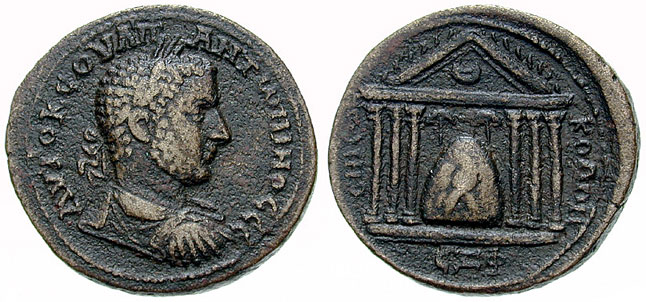
The Emesa temple to the sun god El-Gabal, with the holy stone, on the reverse of this bronze coin by Roman usurper Uranius Antoninus

Under the Romans, Emesa began to show attributes of a Greek city-state and traces of Roman town planning still remain. Its transformation into a major city was completed under the reign of Emperor Antoninus Pius (138–161) when Emesa began to mint coins. By the 3rd century, it grew prosperous and well integrated into the Roman Orient. This was partly due to the marriage of Emperor Lucius Septimius Severus to a woman from a family of notables based in Emesa. According to a text of Ulpian (Digest 50.15.1.4) and another one of Paul (Digest 50.15.8.6), Caracalla and Elagabalus each promoted Emesa to the rank of a colonia and granted ius Italicum to it; Eugène Albertini has hypothesized about a revocation by Macrinus of the privileges given by Caracalla and a reestablishment of those by Elagabalus. Elagabalus served as the high priest at the Temple of El-Gebal, the local Arab sun god. He brought the image of this god, a conical black stone (Baetyl), to the Elagabalium in Rome.

Emesa also grew wealthy because it formed a link in the eastern trade funnelled through Palmyra; however, this dependence also caused the city's downfall when Palmyra sank to insignificance in the 4th century. Nonetheless, Emesa at this time had grown to rank with the important cities of Tyre, Sidon, Beirut, and Damascus. It also continued to retain local significance, because it was the market centre for the surrounding villages. The city remained a strong centre of paganism, because of the Temple of El-Gabal. After one of his victories over Zenobia, Emperor Aurelian visited the city to pay thanks to the deity.

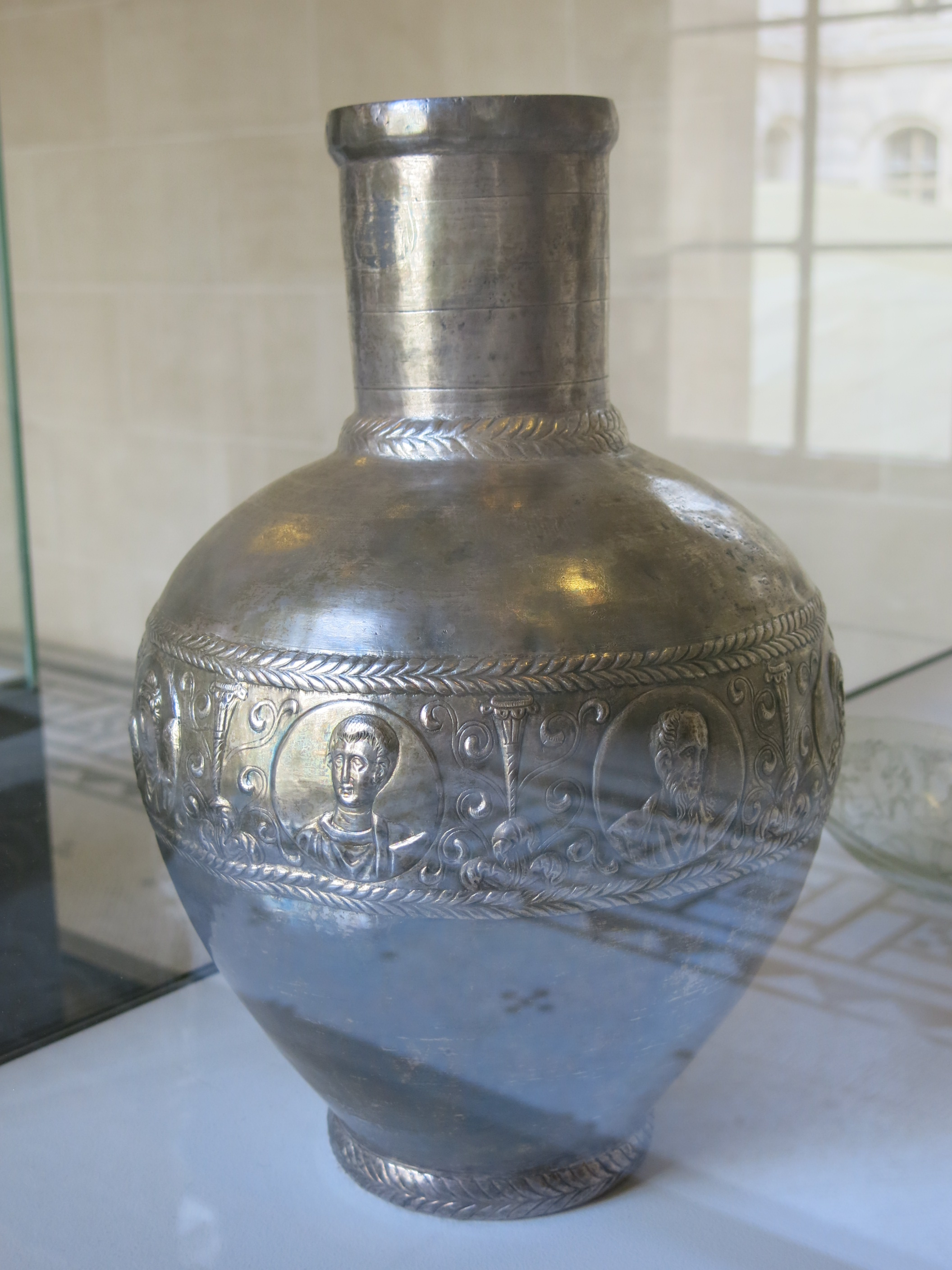
Silver vase from Emesa, decorated with busts of biblical figures (end of 6th century or beginning of 7th). Louvre Museum

Some frescoes inside the Church of Saint Elian date back to the 6th century (not the ones pictured)

Due to the strength of the pagan sun cult in Emesa, Christians initially did not settle in the city. Eusebius writes that Silvanus, the city's first bishop, had no jurisdiction over the city, but the surrounding villages. He was executed by Emperor Julian and succeeded by Bishop Antonius—the first bishop to settle Emesa. By the 5th century, Christianity was well established under the Byzantine Empire; however, few ancient Christian inscriptions exist in Homs today. Under the Byzantines, the city became an important centre for Eastern Christianity. Initially a diocese, Homs was given the status of ecclesiastical metropolis after the discovery of John the Baptist's head in a nearby cave in 452. Nemesius, who lived in the fourth or early fifth century AD, was the bishop of Emesa.

During the Byzantine–Sasanian War of 602–628, Emesa fell in 613 to Shahrbaraz and was in Sasanian hands until near the end of the war.

=== Arab caliphates and dynasties ===
Prior to the Muslim conquest of the Levant, tribes of Arabia, particularly the Banu Kalb, settled around Emesa, ensuring its position as an important centre for the Qays and Yaman tribes. The Byzantine emperor Heraclius abandoned the city, which served as his headquarters, after his army's defeat by the Rashidun Caliphate under Umar during the Battle of the Yarmuk (now the Jordan–Syria border).

In 637 CE, the Rashidun army, led by Khalid ibn al-Walid, captured Emesa peacefully because its inhabitants agreed to pay a substantial ransom of 71,000 to 170,000 dinars. Caliph Umar established Homs as the capital of Jund Hims, a district of the province of Bilad al-Sham, encompassing the towns of Latakia, Jableh, and Tartus along the coast, Palmyra in the Syrian Desert and the territory in between, including the town of Hama. Homs was likely the first city in Syria to have a substantial Muslim population.

In 638, Heraclius sought help from the Christian Arab tribes in Upper Mesopotamia, mainly from Circesium and Hīt, and they mustered a large army and besieged Emesa. However, the siege was a failure, as the coalition forces lost heart and abandoned the city as at the time Iyad ibn Ghanm invaded their homeland in an effort to counter their act.

The Muslims transformed half of St. John's Church into the city's Friday mosque (Great Mosque of al-Nuri) and Homs soon became a centre of Islamic piety since some 500 companions of Muhammad (Arabic: اَلصَّحَابَةُ, romanized: al-ṣaḥāba) settled there after its conquest. The tombs of Khalid ibn al-Walid, his son Abd al-Rahman, and the son of Umar Ubayd Allah, are located in the city.

During the First Fitna, the conflict between the Umayyad dynasty and their partisans and Ali and his partisans, the inhabitants of Homs allied themselves with Ali. When he was defeated, the Umayyad caliph Mu'awiya hived the northern half of Jund Hims to form a separate district, Jund Qinnasrin, apparently as punishment. Ali's oratory (mashhad 'Ali) was located in the city, and Islamic tradition claims his fingerprints are engraved on it.

Despite repression by the Umayyads, Homs remained a centre of Shia Islam for a while longer. As a stronghold of the Banu Kalb, a Yamani tribe, the city became heavily involved in the Qays–Yaman rivalry. The last Umayyad caliph, Marwan II, enjoyed the support of the Qays and subsequently razed the city walls in response to a rebellion by the Banu Kalb.

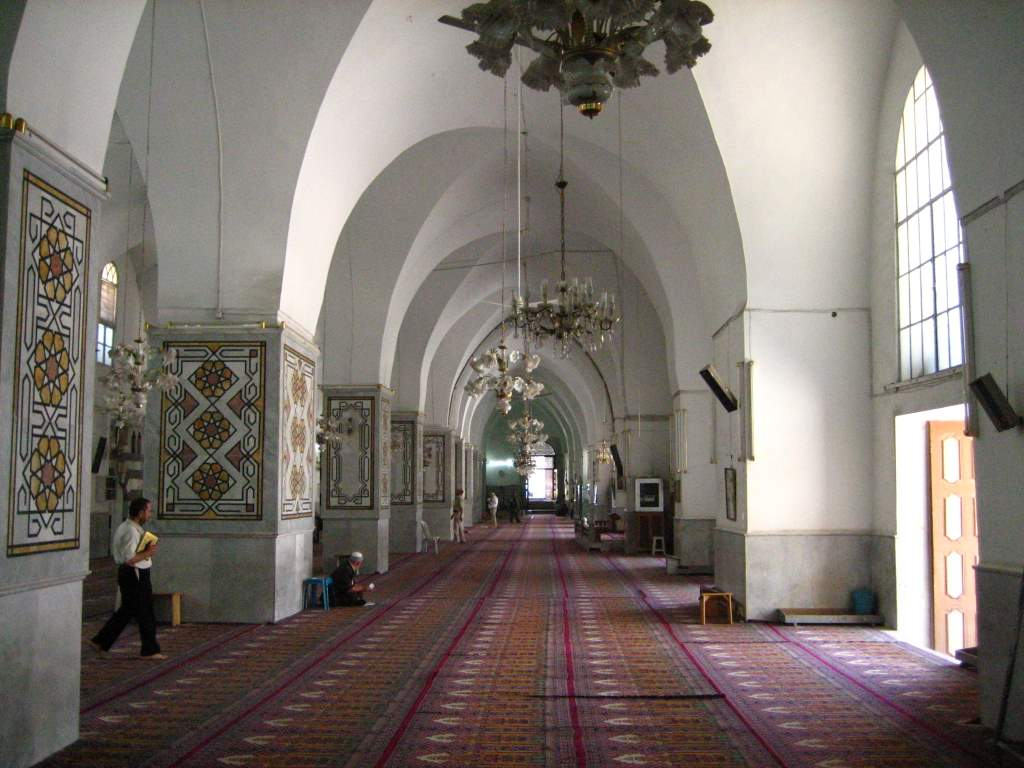
The interior of the Great Mosque of al-Nuri

In 750, the Abbasid Caliphate wrested control of Syria, including Homs, from the Umayyads, and the Arab tribes revolted. Despite the prosperity Homs experienced during this era, Abbasid rule was generally not welcomed nevertheless. During and after the reign of Caliph Harun al-Rashid (796–809), the Abbasid authorities sent numerous punitive expeditions against Homs. Under the reign of Caliph al-Mutawakkil, in October 855, the Christian population revolted in response to additional taxation. The caliph put down the revolt by expelling Christians from the city, burning down their churches and executing members of their leadership.

With Abbasid rule over the Caliphate weakening in the mid-9th century, Homs became sought after by rebel dynasties contending for control of Syria due to the city's strategic position. Initially, the Egypt-based Tulunids came into control of it, but they were forced out by the Aleppo-based Hamdanids, who were briefly succeeded by the Qarmatians, after the latter's Turkish rebel ally Alptakin invaded northern Syria and established Homs as his base.

In 891, Muslim geographer al-Yaqubi noted that Homs was situated along a broad river which served as a source of drinking water for the inhabitants. It was one of the largest cities in Syria and had several smaller districts surrounding it. In 944 the Hamdanids took definitive control of the city, dominating it until 1016. Arab geographer al-Mas'udi claimed in the early 10th century that Homs was "noted for the personal beauty of its inhabitants." In 985, al-Maqdisi noted that Homs was the largest city in all of Syria, but it had suffered "great misfortunes" and was "threatened with ruin." He stated that when the city was conquered by the Muslims they turned half of its church into a mosque.

For around thirty years during the 10th century, Homs was raided by the Byzantines led by Nikephoros II Phokas in October 968, and its inhabitants were subject to slaughter and plunder while the Great Mosque of al-Nuri was briefly restored as a church. In 974–975, John I Tzimiskes managed to control the city during his Syrian campaigns.

Throughout most of the 11th century, the Byzantine raids receded greatly and the Mirdasids of the Banu Kilab tribe ruled over Homs, replacing the Hamdanids. Inclined towards Shia Islam, they did not oppose the Isma'ili Shi'i Fatimid Caliphate of Egypt, which was aiming to extend its rule into northern Syria and Iraq at the time. This precipitated a Sunni Muslim reaction led by the Saljuqid Turks, who occupied Homs under the leadership of Aq Sunqur al-Hajib in 1090.

=== Saljuqid, Ayyubid, and Mamluk rule ===
The First Crusade was launched in 1096, and in 1098, the Crusaders captured Antioch to the northwest, looted Ma'arrat al-Nu'man, and finally besieged Homs itself. Although they managed to cut the city off from its main port Tartus, they failed in taking the city. Soon after, Homs came under the control of the Saljuqid ruler of Damascus, Duqaq, who transformed it into a large, fortified camp and key fortress effectively preventing the Crusaders from penetrating deeper into Muslim territory. Immune from attack, Homs became a point where the Muslims could marshal their forces and launch raids against Crusader holdings along the Mediterranean coast. In the early 12th century, the Saljuqids engaged in internal fighting, during which Homs was often a prize. In 1149 the Mosul-based Zangids under Nur al-Din captured the city.

Muslim geographer al-Idrisi noted in 1154 that Homs was populous, had paved streets, possessed one of the largest mosques in Syria, contained open markets, and was frequented by travellers attracted to its "products and rarities of all kinds." He also reported that its residents were "pleasant; living with them is easy, and their manners are agreeable. The women are beautiful and are celebrated for their fine skin." A series of earthquakes in 1157 inflicted heavy damage upon Homs and its fortress, then in 1170, a minor quake finished off the latter. However, because of its strategic importance, being opposite of the Crusader County of Tripoli, the city and its fortifications were soon restored. In 1164, Nur al-Din awarded Homs to Asad ad-Din Shirkuh as a iqtâ', but reclaimed it five years later following Shirkuh's death. The latter's nephew, Saladin, occupied Homs in early December 1174, but the garrison at the citadel resisted. He later departed for Aleppo, and left a small army in Homs' lower town. The defenders of the citadel offered to set their Christian prisoners free, if Raymond III, Count of Tripoli provided military assistance for them. William of Tyre later emphasized that the commanders of the crusader army doubted if the defenders of the Homs citadel actually wanted to release their prisoners. Saladin returned to Homs soon after he was informed about the negotiations between the crusaders and the garrison. Instead of attacking him, the crusader army retreated to Krak des Chevaliers; this enabled Saladin to capture the citadel on 17 March 1175. In 1179, after reorganising his territories in northern Syria, Saladin restored Homs to his Ayyubid dynasty. Shirkuh's descendants retained Homs for nearly a century until 1262 with the death of al-Ashraf Musa. In 1225, Arab geographer Yaqut al-Hamawi mentioned that Homs was large, celebrated and walled, having a strongly fortified castle on its southern hill.

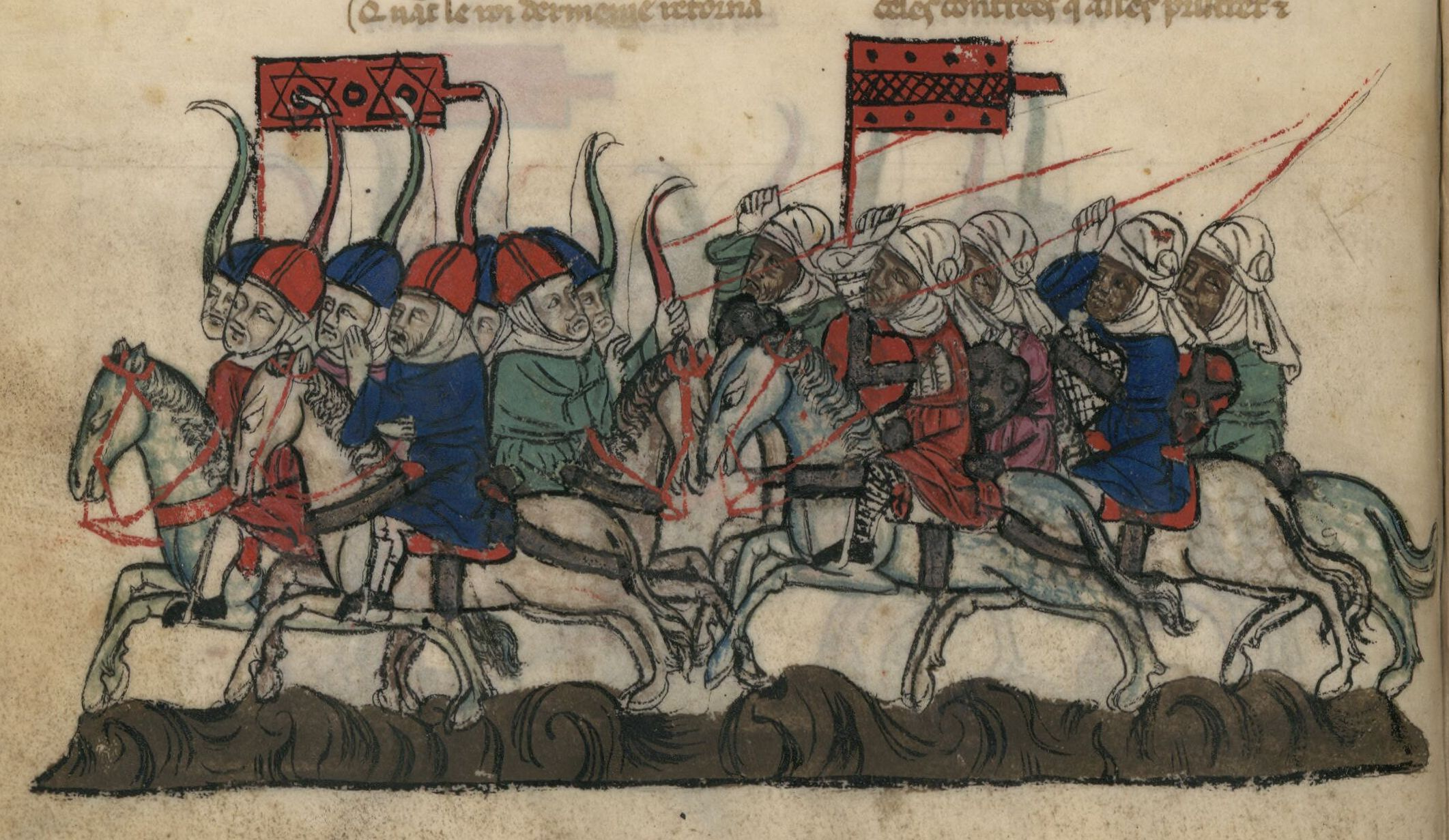
Mamluks chasing archers at the Homs Battle of 1281 (manuscript of La Fleur des histoires de la terre d'Orient, BnF, NAF 886, folio No. 27, verso)

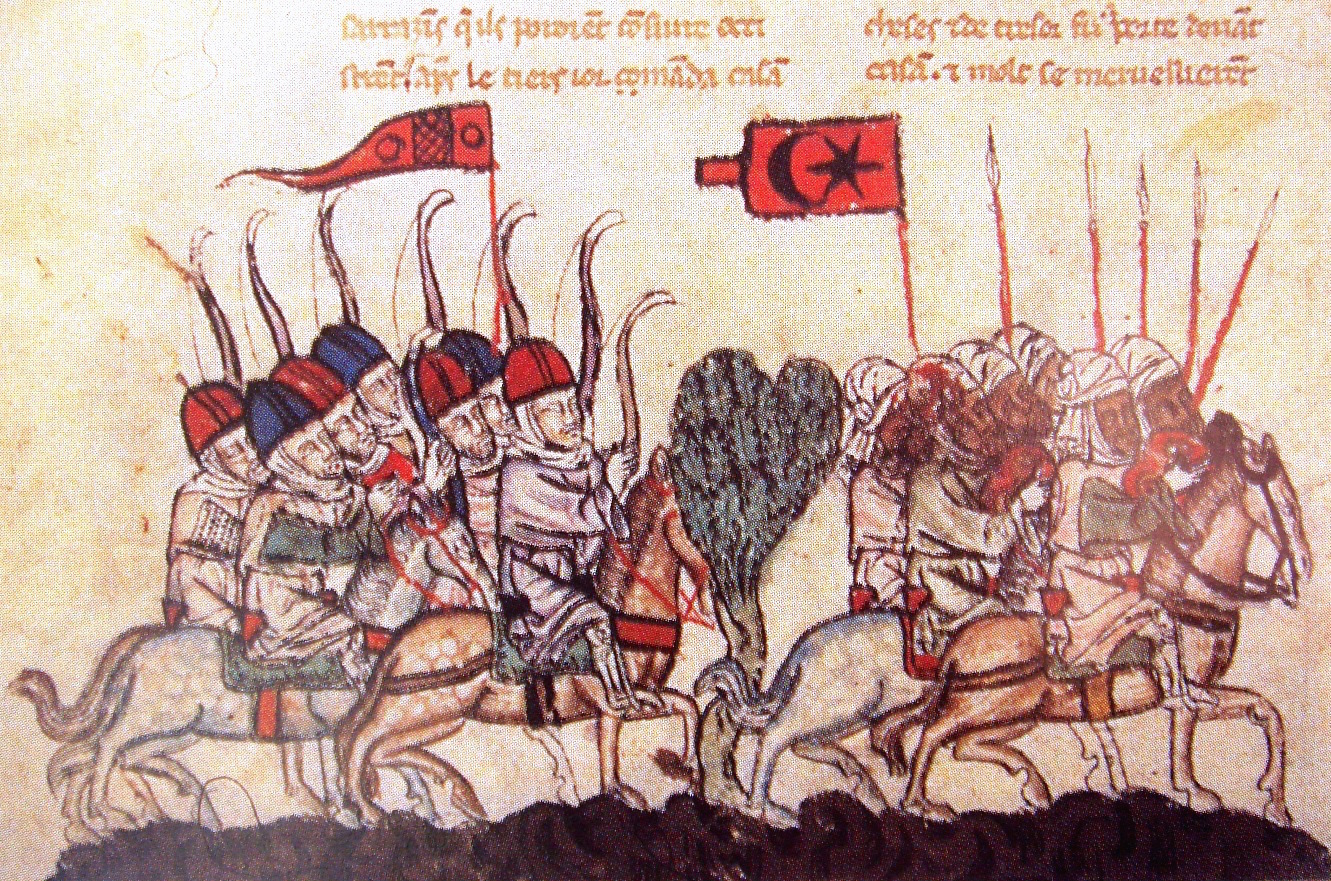
Mamluks being chased by archers at the Homs Battle of 1299 (same manuscript, folio No. 31, verso)

Towards the end of Ayyubid rule, Homs remained a centrepiece of the wars between them and the Crusaders, as well as internecine conflicts with the Mongol Empire and the Mamluks. The First Battle of Homs between the Mongols and the Mamluks took place on 10 December 1260, ending in a decisive Mamluk victory. The Second Battle of Homs was fought on 29 October 1281, also ending in a Mamluk victory. The Mamluks were finally defeated in the Battle of Wadi al-Khaznadar, also known as the "Third Battle of Homs", in 1299.

Homs declined politically after falling to the Mamluks under Baibars because their campaigns effectively drove out the Crusaders and the Mongols from the entirety of Syria. At the beginning of the 14th century, the city was merely the capital of the smallest province of Syria and was often attached to the province of Damascus. Ibn Batuta visited Homs in 1355, writing that it had fine trees, good markets, and a "fine Friday Mosque", noting that all of its inhabitants were Arabs. Timur seized the city in 1400. Nevertheless, he did not sack it as he did in Aleppo, Hama and later Damascus, due to a man called "'Amr bin al-Rawas" who conciled with him offering precious gifts to save the city. Later in the 15th century as Mamluk weakness had brought insecurity to the countryside, Homs was ravaged by Bedouin raids; In 1510 a powerful tribe led by al-Fadl bin Nu'ayr was sent on an expedition by the governor of Damascus to loot the city markets as Homs had failed to pay compensation for his "services".

=== Ottoman rule ===
In 1516, Homs was incorporated into the Ottoman Empire and consequently suffered a greater political eclipse, but it continued to thrive as an economic centre, processing the agricultural and pastoral products that flowed to it from surrounding districts. By the end of the 16th century, the population had increased to roughly 24,000 people, nearly double what it had been at the time of the Ottoman conquest. About 75% of its residents were Muslims, while 24% residents were Christians and the remaining 1% Jews. Homs was particularly well known for silk and wool weaving, especially the alaja, which was mottled muslin run through with gold threads and used in feminine apparel. This silk was exported as far as the Ottoman capital Istanbul. In addition to weaving industries, there were olive oil presses and water mills for wheat and sesame, while grapes and rice, grown in the surrounding marshlands from the 16th century, were found in abundance in the city's markets. Moreover, the markets of Homs were the centre of a trade in livestock, where flocks of sheep and goats coming from Aleppo met camels and cattle moving north from Damascus.

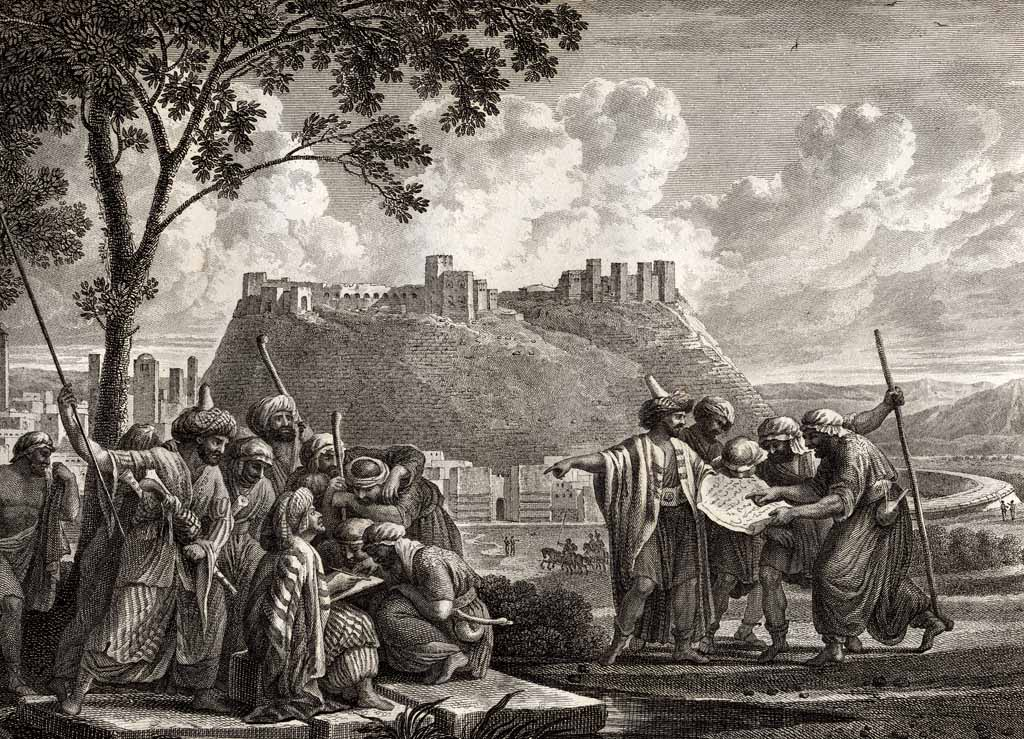
18th-century illustration of Homs by Louis-François Cassas. The artist in the foreground is shown sketching the Citadel of Homs, surrounded by his guards and inquisitive locals

The coming of the Ottomans brought administrative changes to Homs, as it became the capital city of sanjak ("district") of Homs, attached to the eyalet ("province") of Tripoli—its old rival. In the late 16th century the district was ruled by emir 'Ali Harfush of the famous Shiite Harfush dynasty of the nearby Beqaa valley. Later, a French visitor noted that the city walls and citadel were in good repair, but all within was in decay and only its covered markets "retained their beauty." In 1785 French traveller, Volney wrote of the city's once great importance and its current "miserable" condition. He described it as a large, but ruined village administratively dependent on Damascus. The Ottomans did little to revitalise Homs or ensure its security against Bedouin raids. Tribal unrest throughout the 17th and 18th centuries resulted in the sacking of its markets on several occasions. Security was even more hampered, when in the 18th century, the Ottomans tore down the gates of the city's walls. Around 1708, the emir Hamad al-Abbas of the Mawali Bedouin confederation, whom the Ottomans had named "emir of the desert" (çöl beyi) in the region, actually managed to capture the governor of Homs to hold him for ransom.

The countryside of Homs saw an increase in Bedouin raids in the first half of the 19th century, interrupted by its occupation by Muhammad Ali's Egypt led by Ibrahim Pasha between 1832 and 1840. The city rebelled against Egyptian rule and consequently, the citadel was destroyed when the Egyptians suppressed the revolt. Ottoman rule was soon restored and up to the 1860s, Homs was large enough to form a discrete economic unit of trade and processing of agricultural products from its satellite villages and the neighbouring Bedouin tribes.

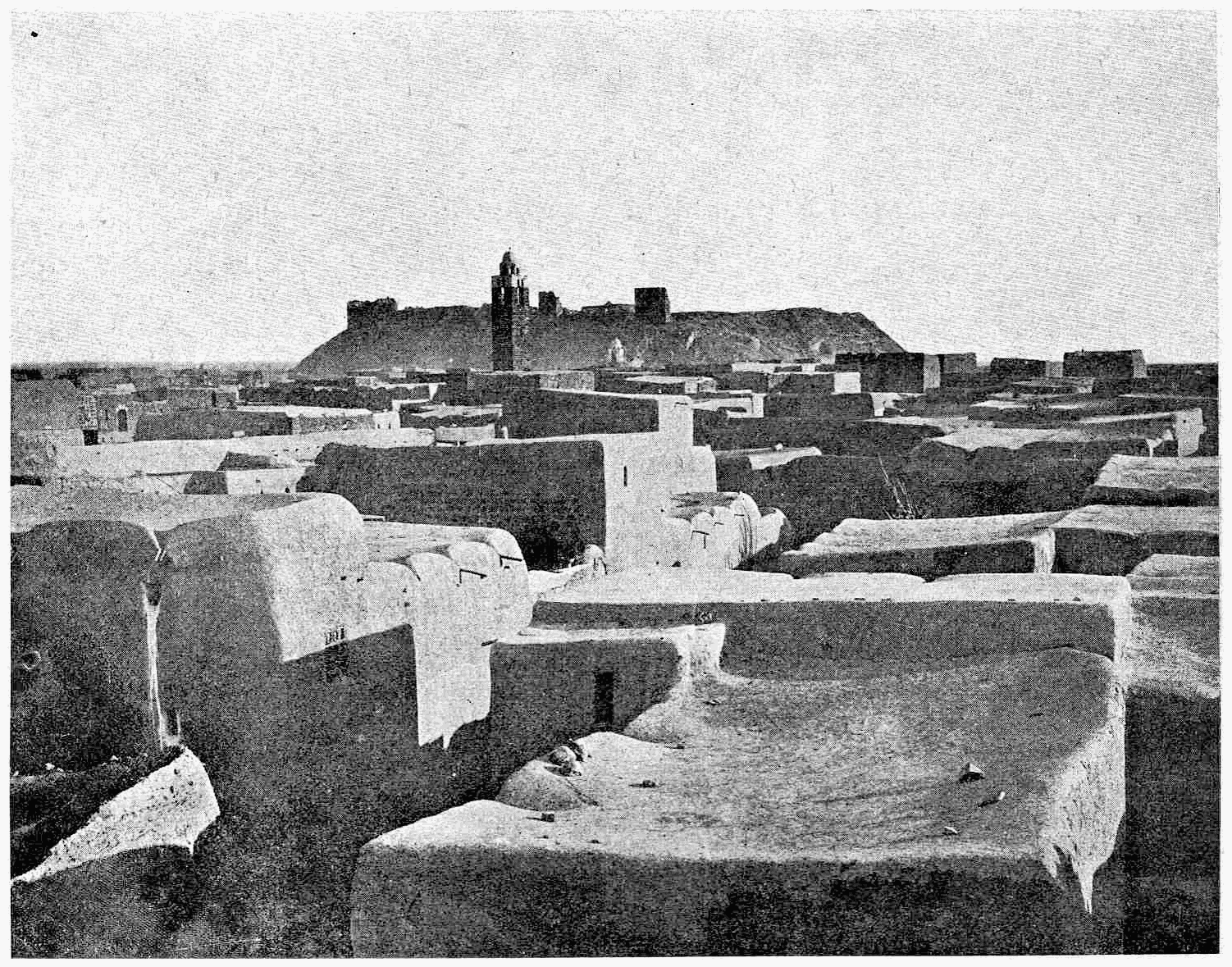
General view of Homs at the end of the 19th century

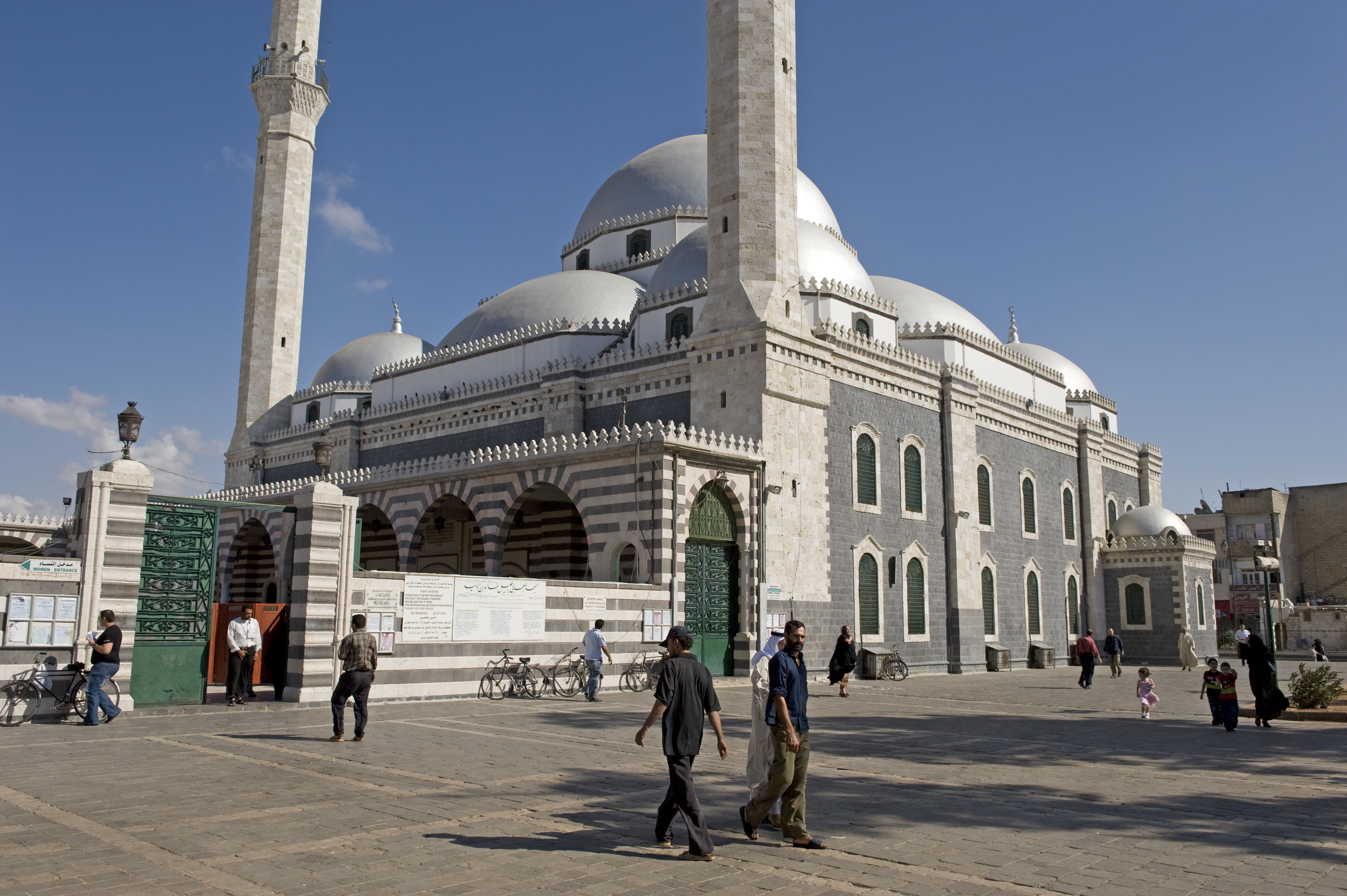
Khalid ibn al-Walid Mosque, an example of Ottoman architecture in Homs, was built in the early 20th century

The local economy was stimulated when the Ottoman government extended security to the city and its surrounding areas; new villages were established and old ones were resettled. However, Homs found itself faced with European economic competition since Ottoman rule was restored. Homs' economic importance was boosted again during the depression of the 1870s, as its cotton industry boomed due to a decline of European textile production. The quality and design of cotton goods from Homs satisfied both the lower and upper classes of the local, Ottoman, and foreign markets. There were around 5,000 looms in Homs and nearby Hama, and one British consul referred to Homs as the "Manchester of Syria".

=== 20th century ===
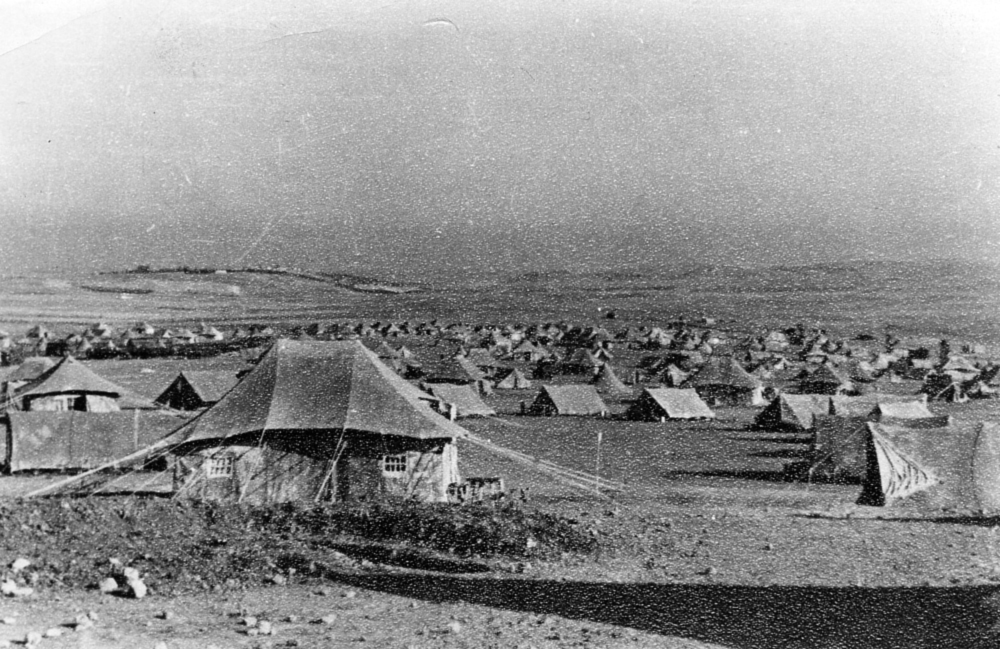
The Homs camp of the Polish Independent Carpathian Rifle Brigade (1940)

Throughout the 20th century Homs held high political importance in the country and was home to several heads of state and other high-ranking government officials. In October 1918, it was captured by the 5th Cavalry Division of the Allied forces. During the French mandate, Homs was part of the State of Damascus. It was considered for some time to become the capital of the Syrian Federation. In Autumn 1925, the city joined Damascus and the southern Druze chieftains in a full-blown revolt against French rule. In 1932, the French moved their military academy from Damascus to Homs to be established in 1933, later known as Homs Military Academy, and it remained the only military academy in Syria until 1967. The French authorities had created a locally recruited military force designated as the Special Troops of the Levant, in which the Alawites were given privileged positions. The military academy in Homs trained the indigenous officers for these Troupes Speciales du Levant. The Homs Military Academy played a major role in the years following Syria's independence, as many of its graduates went on to become high-ranking officers in the Syrian Army, many of them taking part in the series of coup d'états that were to follow. An important example was Hafez al-Assad who became the president of Syria from 1971 until his death in 2000.

An oil pipeline between Tripoli and Kirkuk was built in Homs in the early 1930s and it followed an ancient caravan route between Palmyra and the Mediterranean. In 1959, an oil refinery was built to process some of this oil for domestic consumption. The city's oil refinery was bombed by the Israeli Air Force (IAF) during the 1973 Yom Kippur War.

=== 21st century ===
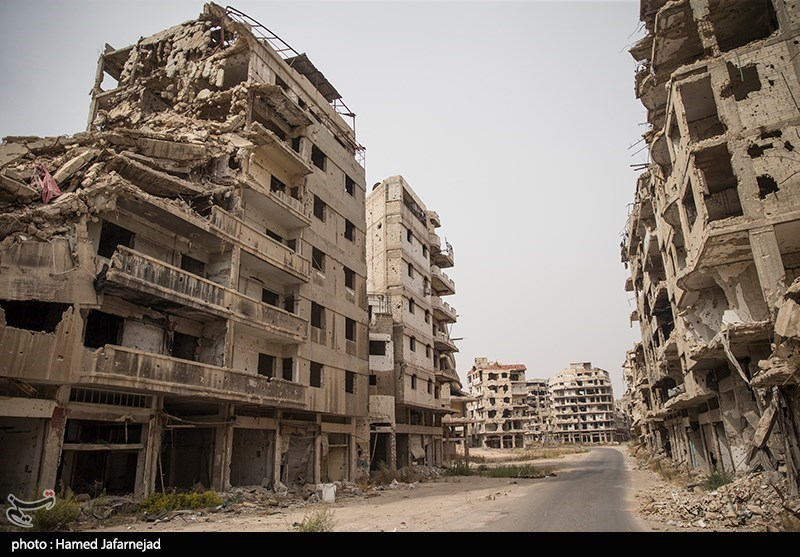
The Syrian civil war caused major destruction in Homs

From May 2011 – May 2014, the city was under siege by the Syrian Army and security forces. The Syrian government claimed it was targeting "armed gangs" and "terrorists" in the area. According to the Syrian opposition, Homs has since become a "blighted city", where authorities regularly block deliveries of medicine, food and fuel to the inhabitants of certain districts. By June, there were near-daily confrontations between protesting residents and Syrian forces. As a result of these circumstances, there have been more deaths in Homs and its vicinity than in other areas of Syria. Homs was the first Syrian city where images of al-Assad and his family were routinely torn down or defaced and the first place where Syrian forces used artillery during the uprising, earning the city the nickname "Capital of the Revolution". The Center for Documenting Violations in Syria claims that at least 1,770 people have been killed in Homs since the uprising began.

On 9 December 2015, under a UN-negotiated deal, the remnants of anti-government forces and their families, that had been under siege the al-Waer district for three years, began to evacuate from the city.

Homs was the site of heavy fighting between government forces and the Syrian opposition during the 2024 Homs offensive. On 7 December 2024, Syrian rebels claimed that they had captured Homs.

== Geography ==
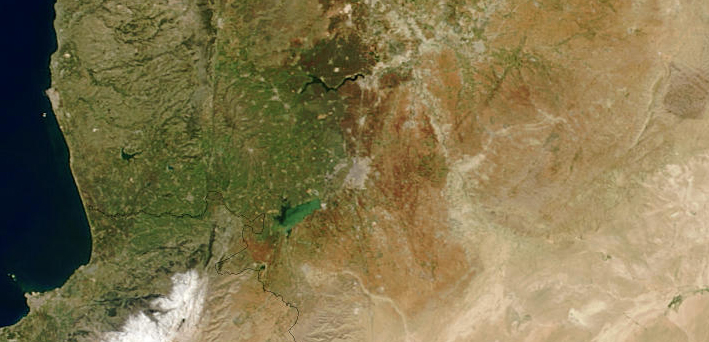
Satellite view

The Governorate of Homs is the largest in Syria. Homs, the governorate's capital, is located in central western Syria, situated along the east bank of the Orontes River in a particularly fertile area. The city is in between the southern outliers of the Coastal Mountain Range located to the west and Mount Lebanon, overlooking the Homs Gap. Because of the gap, the area around Homs receives much more rainfall and gusty winds than interior regions to its north and south. To the east of Homs, is the Syrian Desert. Lake Homs, impounded by a huge dam of Roman origins, is to the southwest, lying some 125 kilometres (78 mi) south of Aleppo and 34 kilometres (21 mi) south of Hama, halfway on the road between the capital Damascus and Aleppo. The Orontes River splits the city into two main sections: To the east, on a flat land lies the city centre and the main neighbourhoods; to the west, lies the more recent and modern suburb of al-Waer. The city spans an area of 4,800 hectares (19 sq mi).

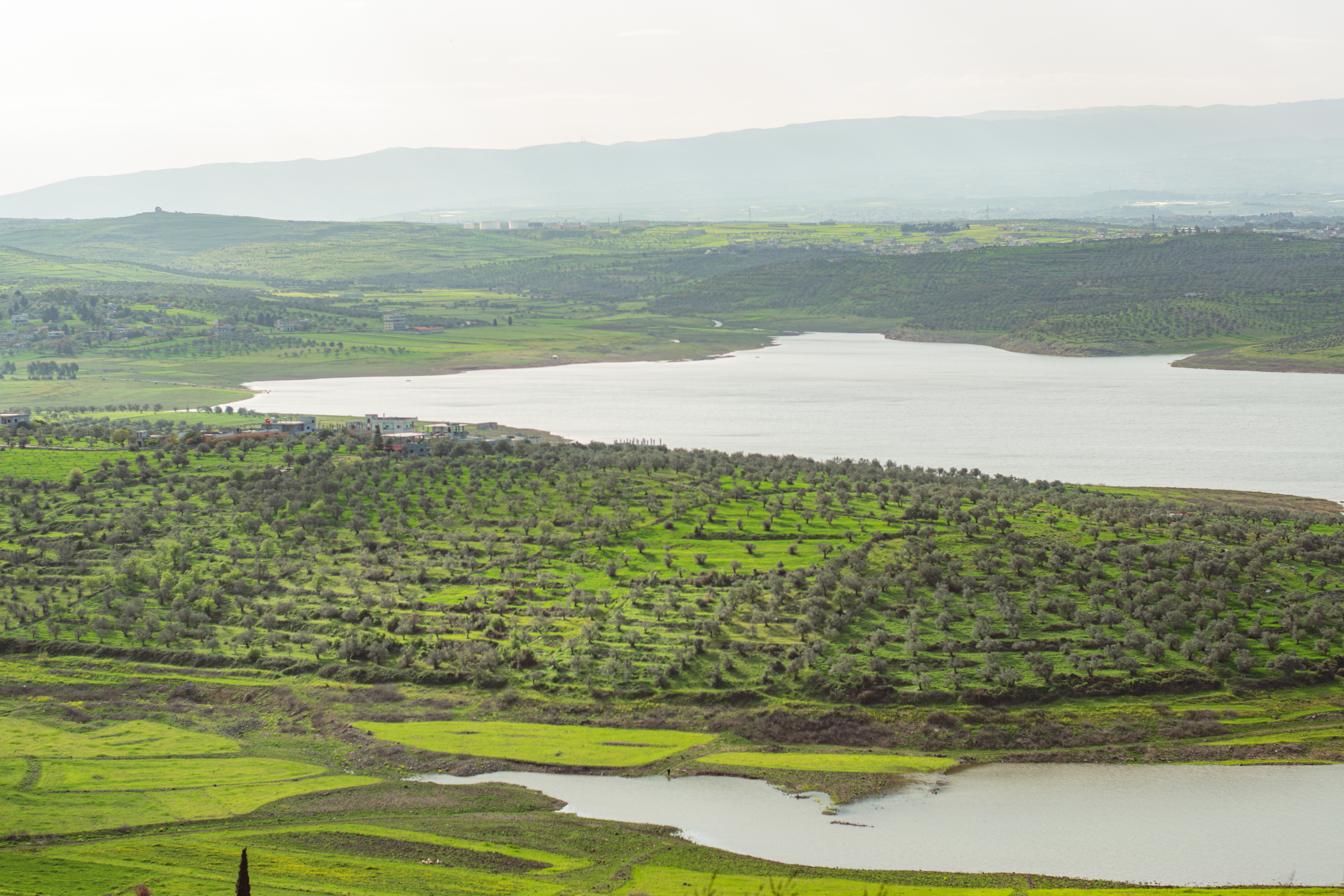
Homs Countryside

Homs is located 162 kilometres (101 mi) north of Damascus, 193 kilometres (120 mi) south of Aleppo, 47 kilometres (29 mi) south of Hama, and 186 kilometres (116 mi) southeast of Latakia on the Mediterranean coast. Nearby towns and villages include al-Rayyan to the southeast, Maskanah, al-Nuqayrah, Abil and Kafr Aya to the south, al-Qusayr, Qattinah and al-Buwaydah al-Sharqiyah to the southwest, Khirbet Tin Nur to the west, al-Dar al-Kabirah to the northwest, al-Ghantu, Teir Maalah, al-Mukhtariyah and Talbiseh to the north, al-Mishirfeh to the northeast and Fairouzeh and Zaidal to the east.

=== Old City and subdivisions ===
The Old City is the most condensed area of Homs, and it includes the neighbourhoods of Bab Tadmur, Bab al-Dreib, Bab Hud and the immediate vicinity of the citadel, covering an area of 1.2 square kilometres (0.46 sq mi). Little remains of the Old City; its walls and gates were demolished in the Ottoman era, but a short section of fortified wall with a circular corner tower still exists. Half a kilometre to the south, a large earth mound marks the site where the citadel once stood. To the north of the citadel lies the Christian Quarter, known as "al-Hamidiyah". This neighbourhood is one of the few areas of Homs that retains its older look, with most of the alternating black-and-white stone buildings dating from the Mamluk era. They are still used as shops and dwellings, and there has been recent renovation.

At the time of the Abbasids, Homs was known for its seven gates. They were Bab al-Souq (Gate of the Market), Bab Tadmur (Gate of Palmyra), Bab al-Dreib (or Bab al-Deir), Bab al-Sebaa (Gate of the Lions), Bab al-Turkman (Gate of the Turkmen), Bab al-Masdoud (Closed Door), and Bab Hud (The Gate of Hud). Only two gates—Bab Tadmor and Bab al-Dreib—remain today. The oldest of Homs' mosques and churches are located in the Old City.

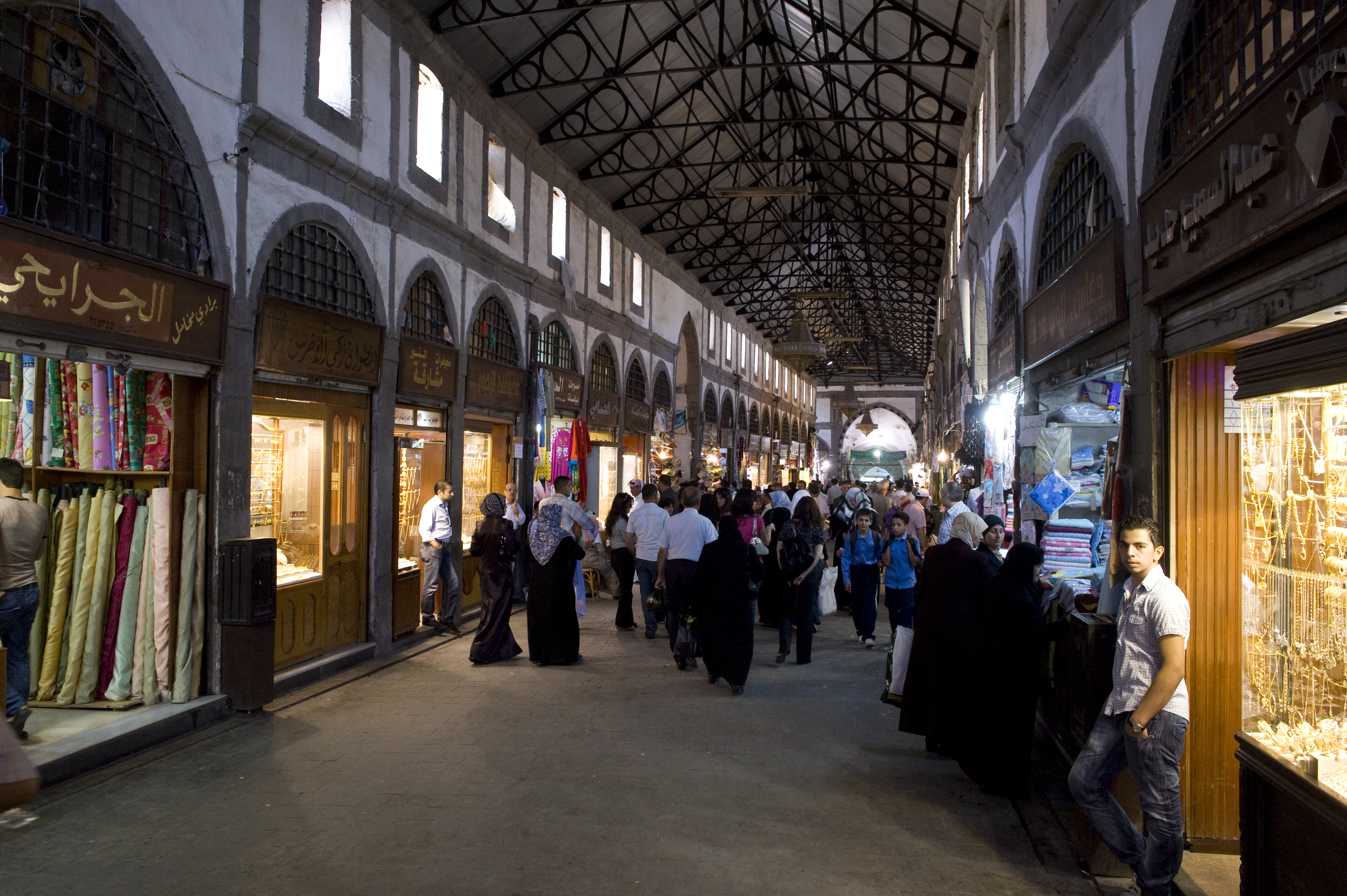
One of the old souks in Homs

Homs consists of several subdivisions outside the Old City. The large neighbourhood of Khaldiyah spreads along its northern edge which is bordered by Al-Bayadah and Deir Baalbah, while the more modern neighbourhoods of al-Sabil, al-Zahra Jub al-Jandali and Armenian quarter are situated to the east of the Old City. South of it are the neighbourhoods of Bab al-Sebaa, al-Mreijeh, al-Adawiyya, al-Nezha, Akrama (Note: The neighbourhood was named after Ikrima ibn Abi Jahl.) and beyond them lay the Karm al-Loz, Karm al-Zaytoun, Wadi al-Dhahab, al-Shamas, Masaken al-Idikhar and Dahia al-Walid neighbourhoods. The modern commercial centre lies to the west in the neighbourhood of Jouret al-Shayyah, and further west are the upscale neighbourhoods of Qusoor, al-Qarabis, al-Baghtasia, al-Mahatta, al-Hamra, al-Inshaat, Karm al-Shami, al-Ghouta and Baba Amr. The suburb of al-Waer is located even further west, separated from the city by areas of farmland called al-Basatin and the Orontes River forming a green belt where it is forbidden to build anything. The Homs University complex and dormitories are located on the western-southern edge of the city next to the neighbourhood of Akrama.

=== Climate ===
Homs has a hot-summer Mediterranean climate (Köppen climate classification: Csa).

Homs' location ensures that it receives softening influences and breezes from the Mediterranean. As a result, the city has a much milder climate than nearby Hama, with higher average rainfall of 18 inches (460 mm) instead of 14 inches (360 mm), but it also experiences greater winds.

Climate data for Homs (1952–2004 normals)
Month	Jan	Feb	Mar	Apr	May	Jun	Jul	Aug	Sep	Oct	Nov	Dec	Year
Mean daily maximum °C (°F)	11.1 (52.0)	13.0 (55.4)	16.6 (61.9)	21.6 (70.9)	27.0 (80.6)	30.8 (87.4)	32.3 (90.1)	32.8 (91.0)	31.3 (88.3)	26.9 (80.4)	19.1 (66.4)	12.5 (54.5)	22.9 (73.2)
Daily mean °C (°F)	7.0 (44.6)	8.2 (46.8)	11.1 (52.0)	15.4 (59.7)	20.0 (68.0)	24.0 (75.2)	26.1 (79.0)	26.5 (79.7)	24.4 (75.9)	19.8 (67.6)	13.1 (55.6)	8.2 (46.8)	17.0 (62.6)
Mean daily minimum °C (°F)	2.8 (37.0)	3.3 (37.9)	5.6 (42.1)	9.2 (48.6)	13.0 (55.4)	17.1 (62.8)	19.8 (67.6)	20.1 (68.2)	17.5 (63.5)	12.7 (54.9)	7.0 (44.6)	3.8 (38.8)	11.0 (51.8)
Average precipitation mm (inches)	95.1 (3.74)	76.5 (3.01)	56.4 (2.22)	33.3 (1.31)	13.0 (0.51)	2.6 (0.10)	0.2 (0.01)	0.0 (0.0)	2.4 (0.09)	21.1 (0.83)	48.1 (1.89)	80.7 (3.18)	429.4 (16.89)
Average precipitation days (≥ 1mm)	13	15	10	6	3	0	0	0	1	4	7	11	70
Mean daily sunshine hours	4	6	7	8	10	12	12	12	10	8	6	5	8
Mean daily daylight hours	10.1	11	12	13.1	14	14.5	14.2	13.4	12.4	11.3	10.4	9.9	12.2
Average ultraviolet index	3	4	6	8	9	11	11	10	8	6	3	2	7
Source 1: WMO
Source 2: Weather Atlas(sun-daylight-UV)

== Demographics ==
Homs Religions
Sunni Muslims	75%
Alawite	15%
Christians	10%

Year	Population
12th century	~7,000
1785	~2,000
1860s (estimate)	15,000–20,000
1907 (estimate)	~65,000
1932	65,000
1960	136,000
1978	306,000
1981	346,871
1994	540,133
2004	652,609
2005 (estimate)	750,000
2008 (estimate)	823,000
2011 (estimate)	806,625
2013 (estimate)	544,428
2017 (estimate)	775,404

Homs was one of the largest cities in Syria in the 12th century with a population of 7,000. In 1785, the inhabitants of Homs numbered more than 2,000 and the population was divided almost evenly between Eastern Orthodox Christians and Muslims. The 1860s saw a rise in the population to 15,000–20,000. By 1907, Homs had roughly 65,000 inhabitants, of which two-thirds were Muslims and the remainder Christians. In the 1981 census, the population stood at 346,871, rising to 540,133 in 1994. According to the 2004 census by Syria's Central Bureau of Statistics, Homs had a population of 652,609 of which 51.5% were male and 48.5% female. In an independent 2005 estimate the city had 750,000 residents, and as of 2008 the population was estimated at 823,000. Homs Governorate had an estimated 1,767,000 people in 2011.

Today, Homs' population reflects Syria's general religious diversity, and is made up primarily of Sunni Muslims (including Arabs, Kurds, and Turkmen), with minorities of Alawites, Eastern Orthodox Christians and Assyrians. In addition to Catholics, Evangelists and Maronites. In the 1880s, the Survey of Western Palestine noted that there were 5,500 Greek Orthodox Christians and 1,500 Syriac Orthodox Christians. The Syriac Patriarchate was transferred to Homs from Mardin in 1933, but relocated once more to Damascus in 1959.

According to the 1914 Ottoman population statistics, the district of Homs had a total population of 80,691; consisting of 67,587 Muslims; 10,246 Orthodox Greeks; 1,327 Catholic Greeks; 774 Assyrians, 751 Latins and 6 Protestants.

During the Armenian genocide in the early 20th century, about 20,000 Armenians immigrated to Homs and the surrounding villages. A small Greek community also still exists in the city.

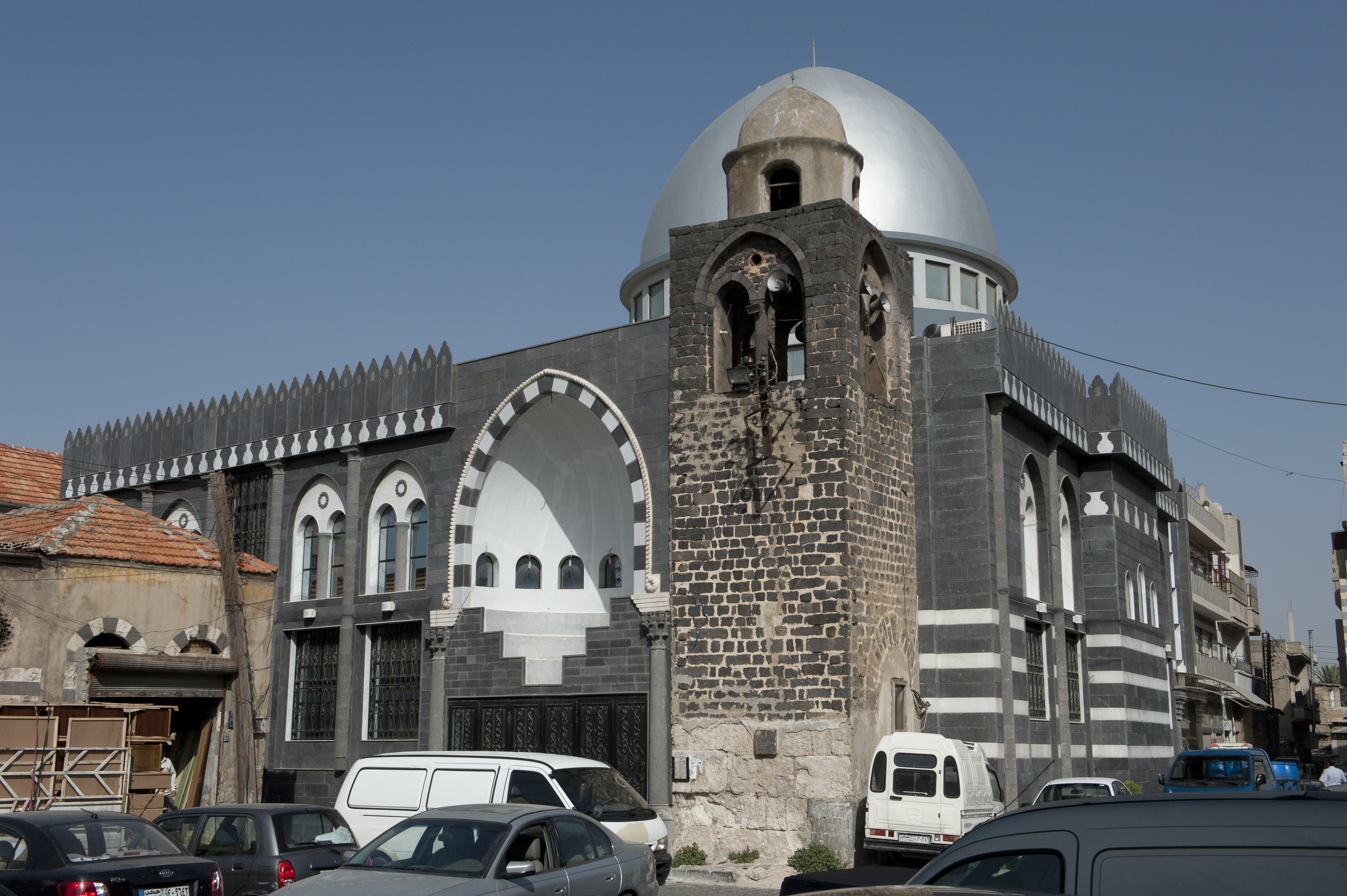
Al-Basrawi Mosque reflects the city’s local architectural traditions, incorporating Ablaq masonry and black stone, features also evident in the city’s mosques and churches.

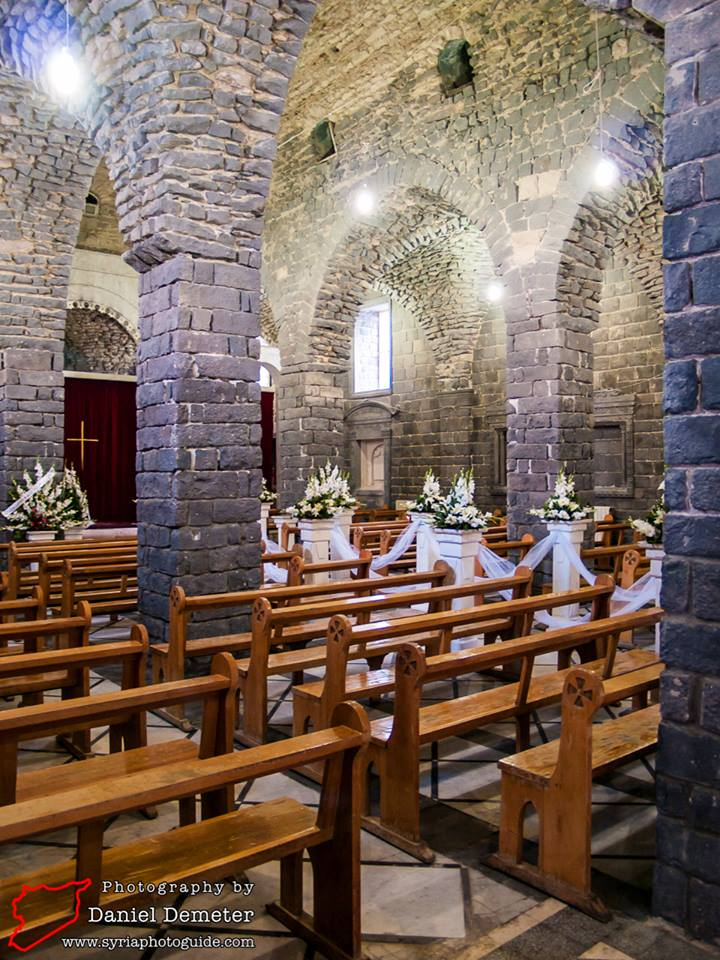
Saint Mary Church of the Holy Belt is a historical Syriac Orthodox Church in Homs, Syria. The church is built over an underground church dating back to 50 AD. It is the seat of the Syriac Orthodox Archdiocese of Homs.

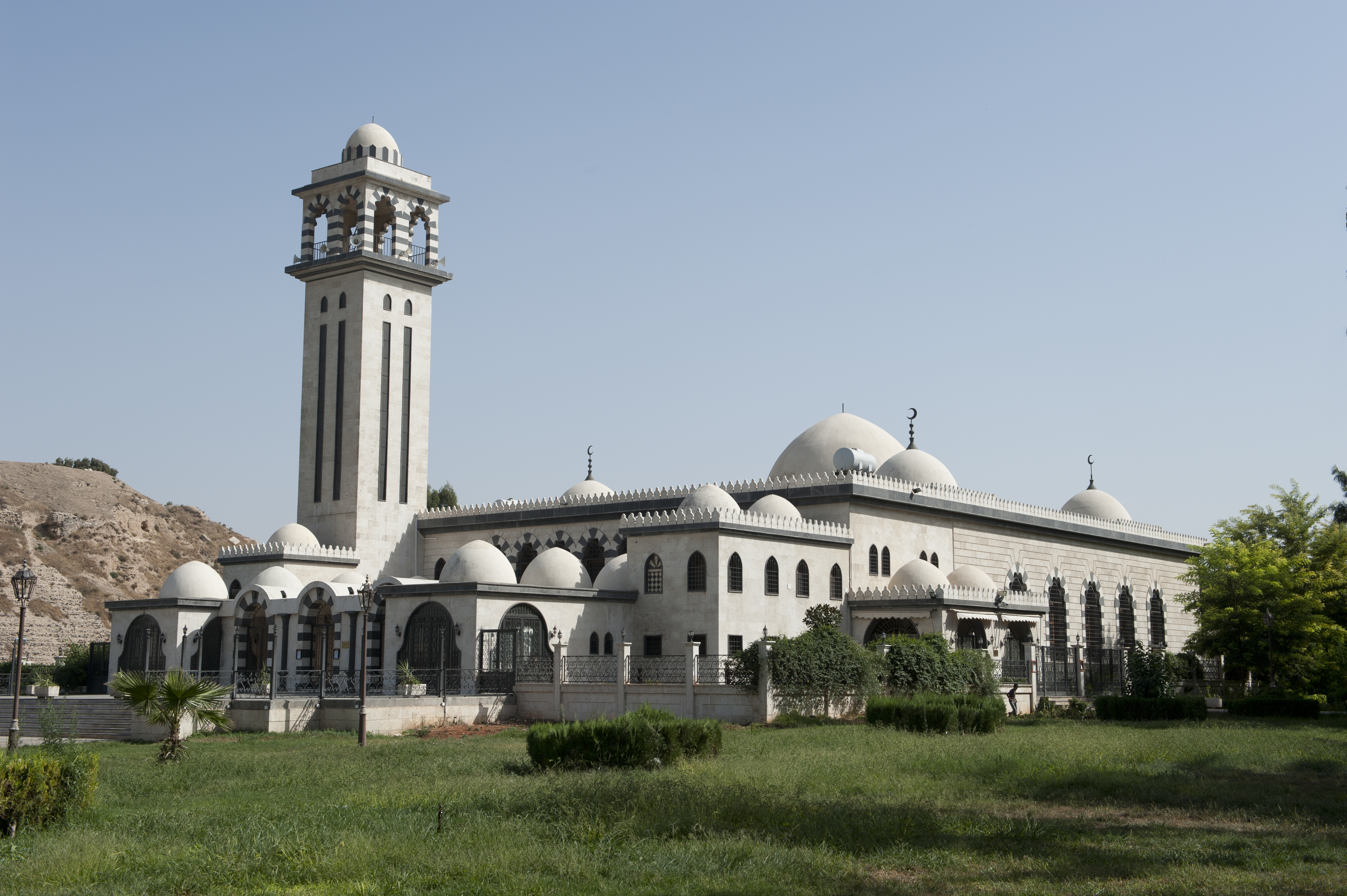
Al-Atassi Mosque

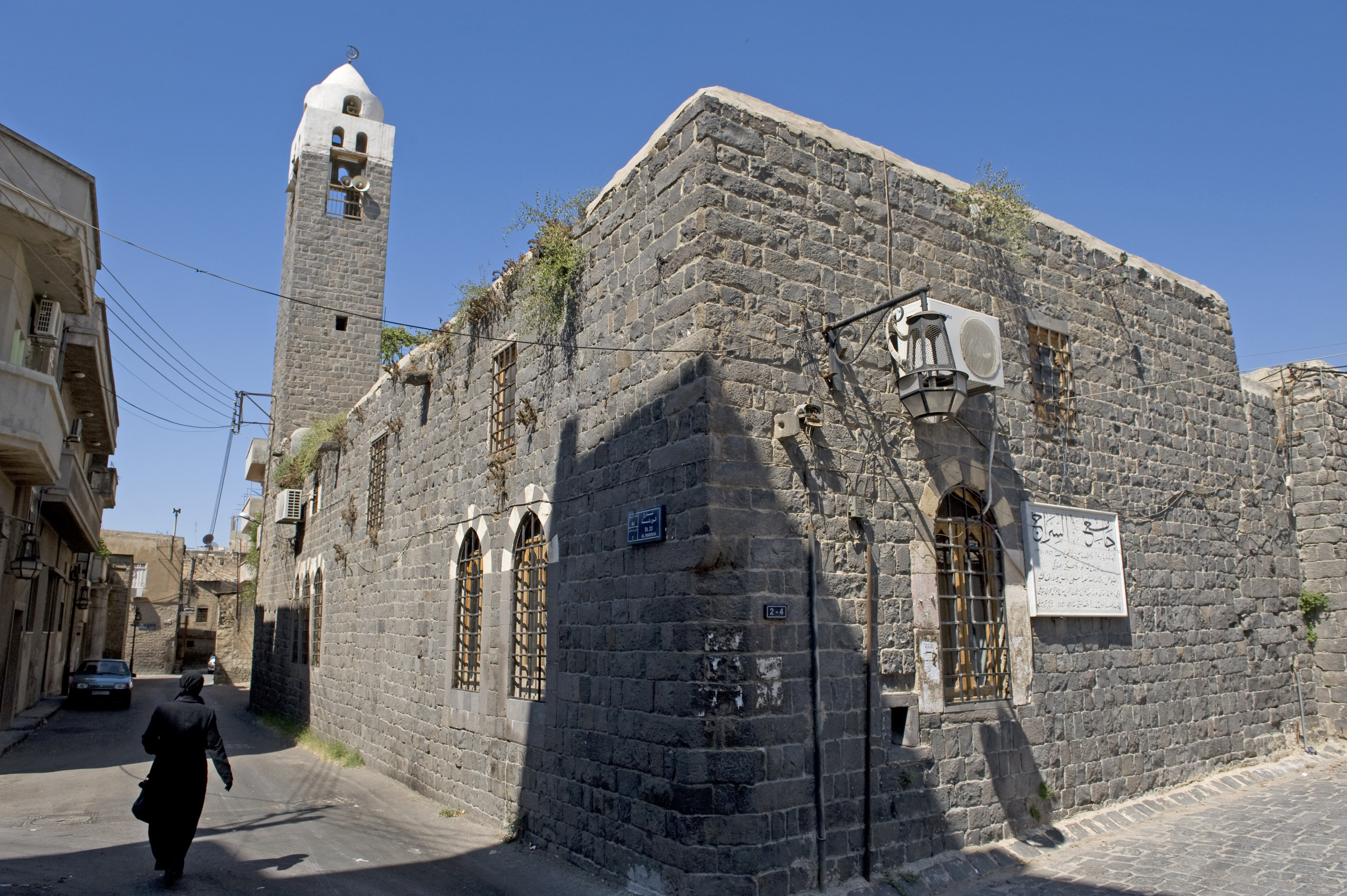
Al-Siraj Mosque

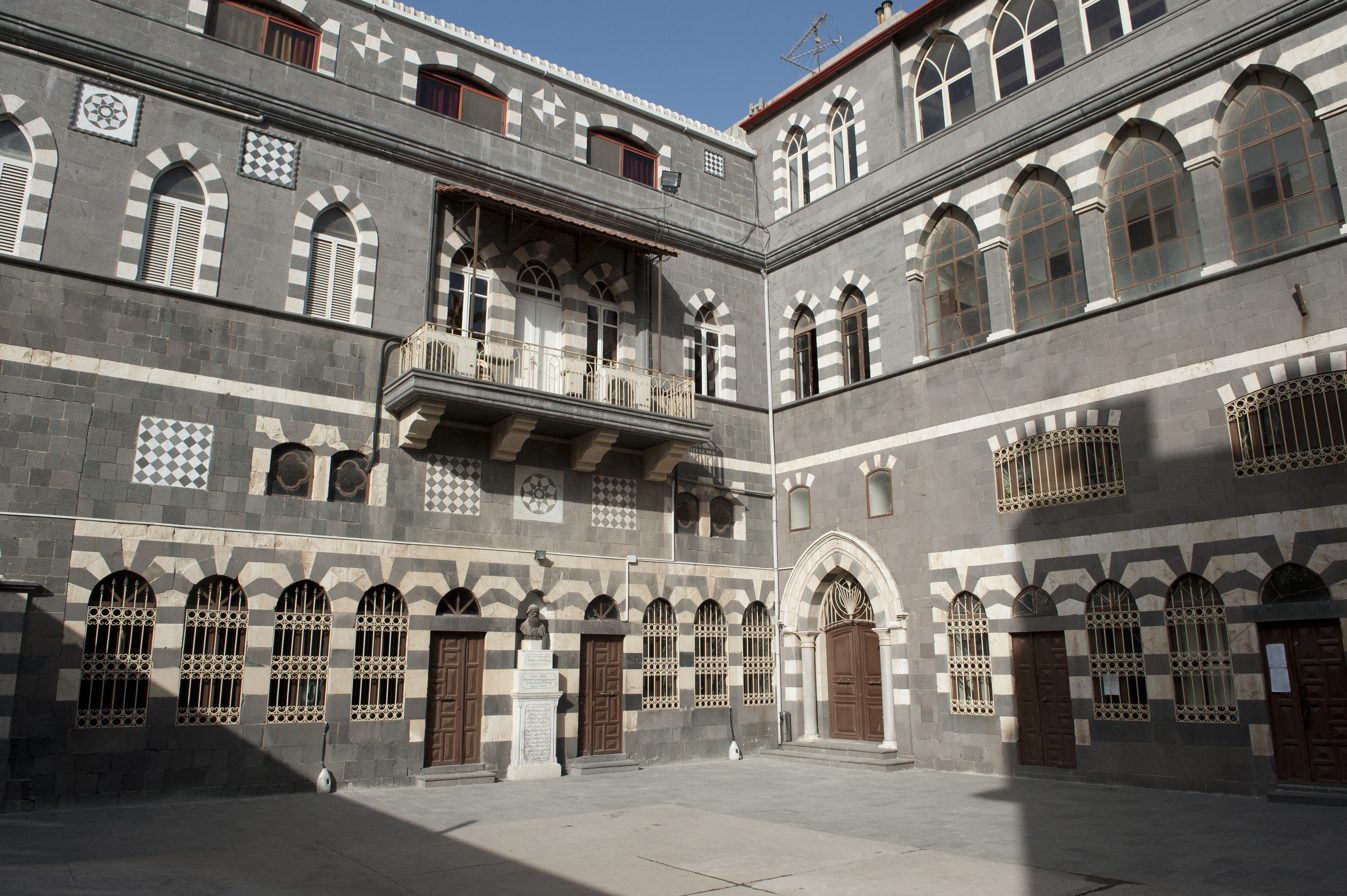
Seat of the Syrian Catholic Archbishop of Homs

== Economy ==
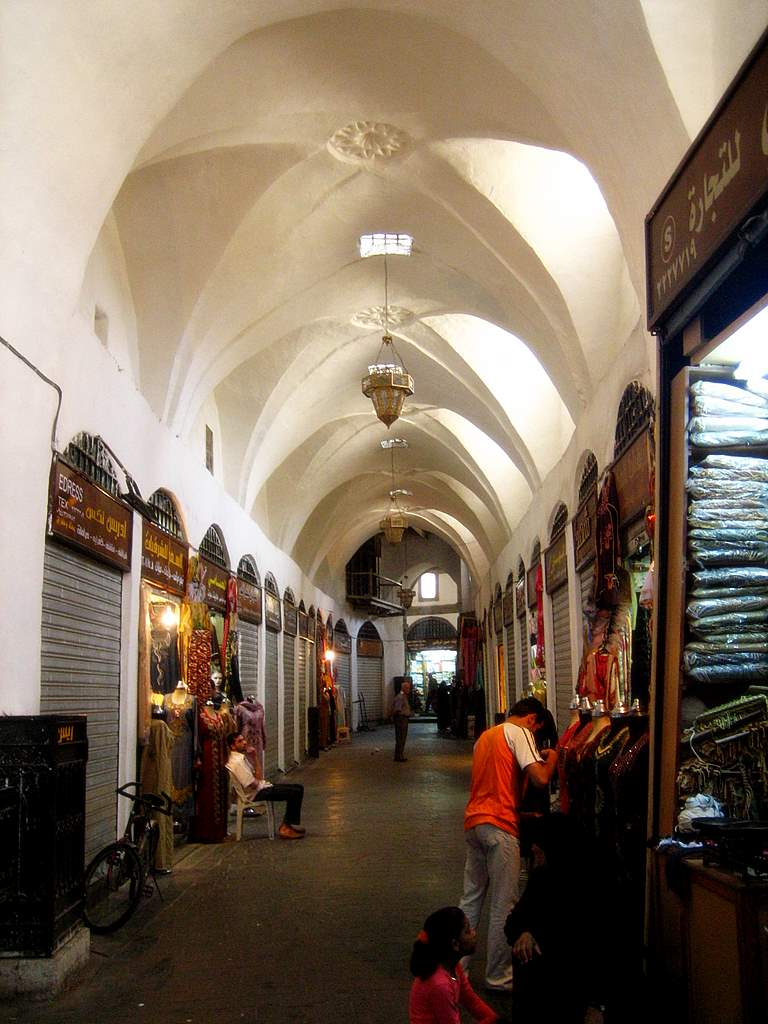
Souk al-Harir, one of the many roofed souks

After long periods of stagnation under Ottoman rule, Homs started to flourish again in the 20th century. Its geographic and strategic location has made it a centre of agriculture and industry. The "Homs Irrigation Scheme", the first of its kind in modern Syria, brought prosperity to cultivators and the long-established enterprises involved in the processing of agricultural and pastoral products. Crops grown in Homs include wheat, barley, lentils, sugar beets, cotton, and vines, as well as serving as a point of exchange between the sedentary zone and the desert. Moreover, because of easy access to the Mediterranean, Homs has attracted overland trade from the Persian Gulf and Iraq.

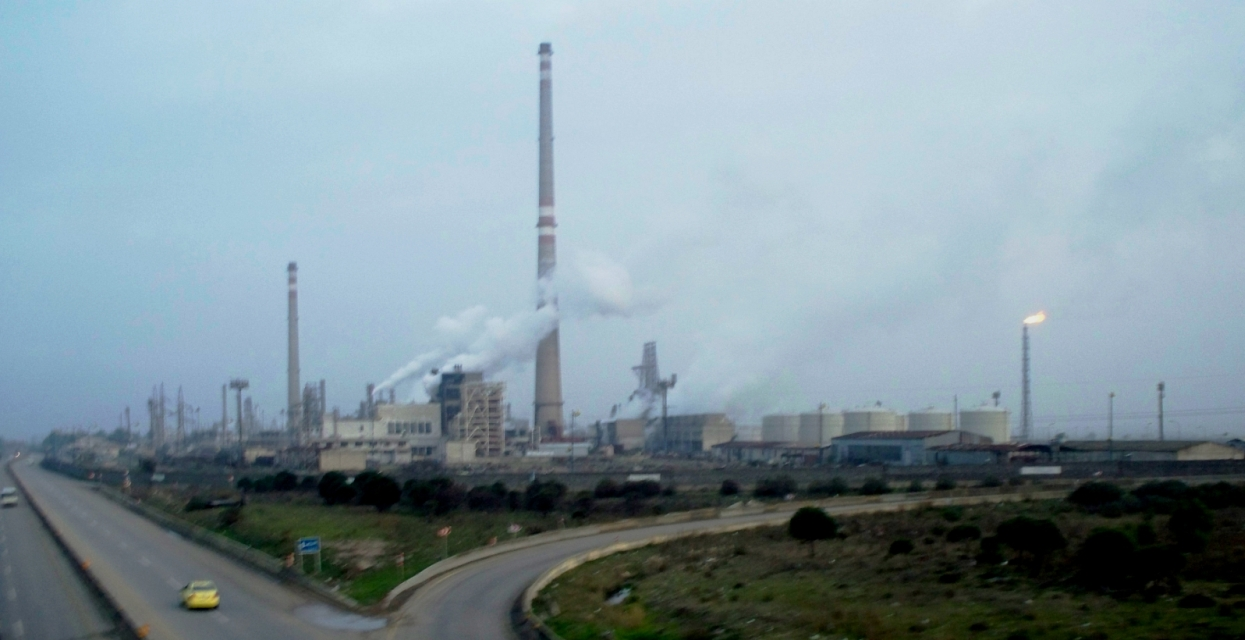
The oil refinery of Homs, built by Czechoslovak firm Technoexport in 1959

Homs is also home to several large public heavy industries, such as the oil refinery west of the city which opened in 1959. A fertiliser plant was built in 1971 to process phosphates from their deposits near Palmyra; the fertiliser is for domestic consumption and export. A growing private industrial sector has flourished in the past decade and many small to medium-sized enterprises occupy the industrial zones northwest and south of the city. A new sugar refinery is being built by a Brazilian company, and an automobile plant is under construction by Iran Khodro. Also a new phosphate plant and oil refinery are being built east of the city. Homs is also the hub of an important road and rail network, it is the central link between the interior cities and the Mediterranean coast.

A major industrial project was the establishment of a new industrial city in Hisyah, 47 kilometres (29 mi) south of the city of Homs. Spreading across some 2,500 hectares (25 km^{2}), the city covers four main industrial sectors: textiles, food, chemical, engineering and vocational. In all, the facilities are designed to accommodate up to 66,000 workers and their families. Moreover, a free zone has been established within the city.

The hinterland of Homs is well known for its grapes which are used in Syria's liqueur industry, particularly in producing arak, nectar wine, and red wine. The city is considered a good base for day trips and excursions to the many historical and touristic sights nearby. Popular destinations include Krak des Chevaliers, Qatna, Talkalakh and Marmarita. Homs has several hotels; Safir Hotel is considered one of Syria's best five-star hotels and the only one of that status in the city. An-Nasr al-Jedid Hotel is built in a 100-year-old mansion and is labelled by tour guides as the "best budget hotel in Homs". Other hotels include Hotel al-Mimas, Ghazi Hotel, and Hotel Khayyam.

== Culture ==
=== Cuisine ===
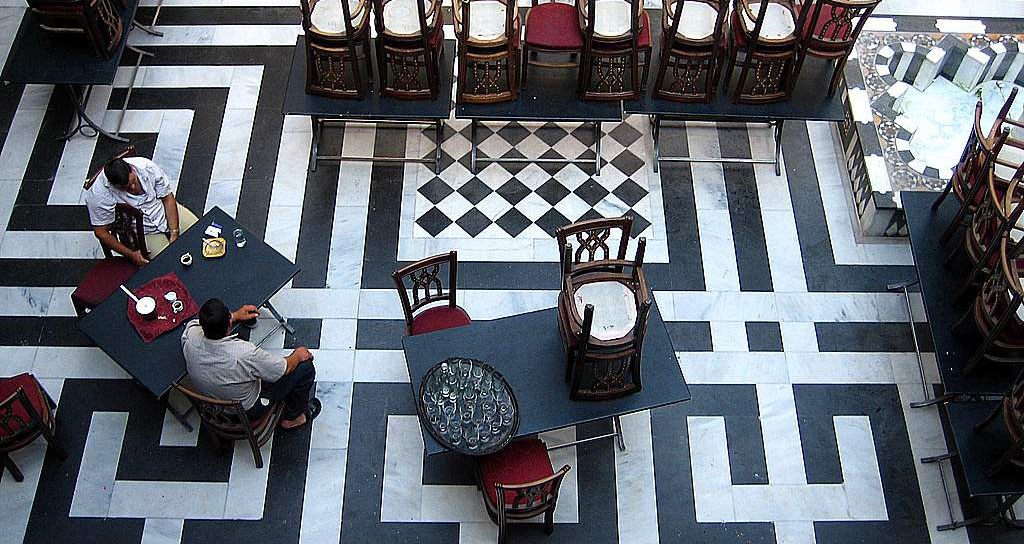
Courtyard of Beit al-Agha restaurant

Although people in Homs eat the same foods common in Levantine cuisine, the city is well known throughout Syria for its own cuisine. A prominent dish is Batarsh, a type of baba ghanouj made with yogurt and garlic instead of tahini. Homs is also home to a variety of kibbeh mishwiyyeh or "grilled kibbeh". It consists of two pancakes of kibbeh stuffed with ground lamb, cooked with lamb fat and various spices. Jazar Mahshi ("stuffed carrot") is native dish in Homs and is made of yellow carrot stuffed with minced lamb, rice. The city specialises in cooking a type of okra meal, known as bamya bi-l zayt ("okra with olive oil").

Homs has an array of restaurants, some specialise in Italian cuisine, while others serve Arabic food. For the local population, popular restaurants serve shawarma, grilled chicken, and other common Syrian foods, as well as homemade juices. In the Old City, low-price restaurants are grouped together along Shoukri al-Quwatly Street and sell similar foods, such as hummus, falafel, various salads (mezze), shish kebab and chicken dishes. Restaurants and coffeehouses typically offer hookahs and are a common place for men to gather and smoke.

=== Museums ===
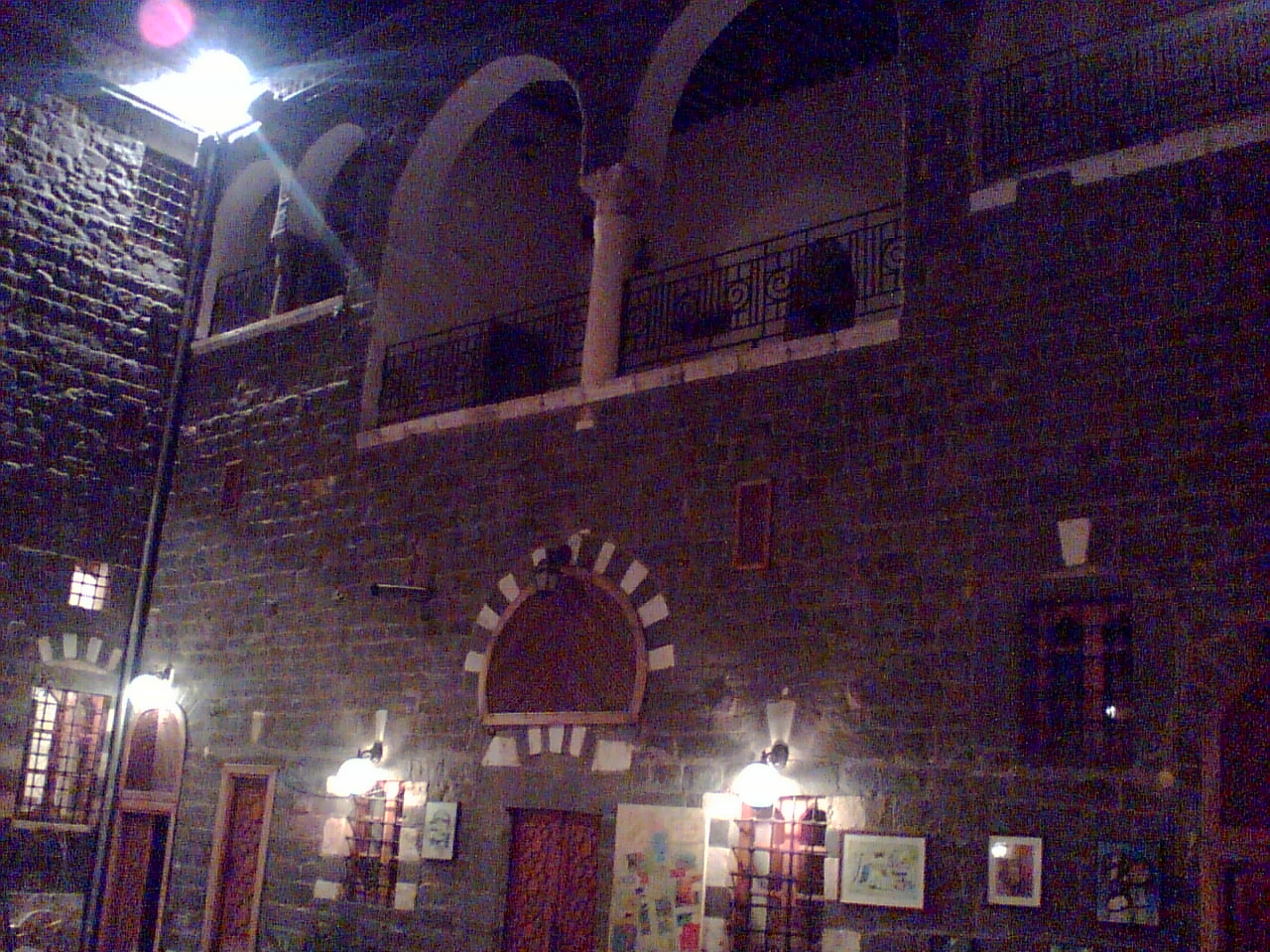
Qasr al-Zahrawi

There are two main museums in Homs, both located in the central part of the city. Qasr al-Zahrawi, a former Mamluk-era palace belonging to Ali ibn Abi al-Fadl al-Azzhari, a subordinate of Baibars, the Mamluk sultan, is now the National Folklore Museum. Outside the building is a courtyard, occupied on one side by a large terraced liwan with a conch shell semi-dome. In the opposite wall, there is a carving of two lions, a symbol of Baibars. The first museum built in the city, Homs Museum founded in 1922, is located along Shoukri al-Quwatly Street and contains a selection of artefacts from the Homs region, covering the time between the prehistoric and Islamic eras.

=== Festivals ===
Homs has several festivals, and the city annually co-hosts the Desert Folk Festival and the Al-Badiya Festival with Palmyra. The Desert Folk Festival is an annual festival of the ancient traditions and costumes of the Badiya (Syrian Desert) and it includes exhibitions and concerts between Homs and Palmyra. The festival is held in the first week of May. The Al-Badiya Festival, which is held mainly in Palmyra with some events in Homs, draws approximately 60,000 tourists during the last week of May. Activities include horse, camel and car races, horse contests, music and theatre shows, antique exhibitions and a crafts market. Other festivals include the al-Nasarah Festival and the Festival of Krak des Chevaliers and the Valley. An annual festival is held at the Church of Saint Elian, attracting large numbers of pilgrims.

Historically, Wednesday was considered an important day for Homs citizens which is related to certain events happened in the history of the city. During the Emesani dynasty era, people who worshipped the sun god Elagabalus held their liturgies at the great "Temple of the Sun" (currently al-Nouri mosque), celebrating the creation of the Sun on "the fourth day" of the divine workweek (The Creation narrative in the Hebrew Bible).

=== Sports ===
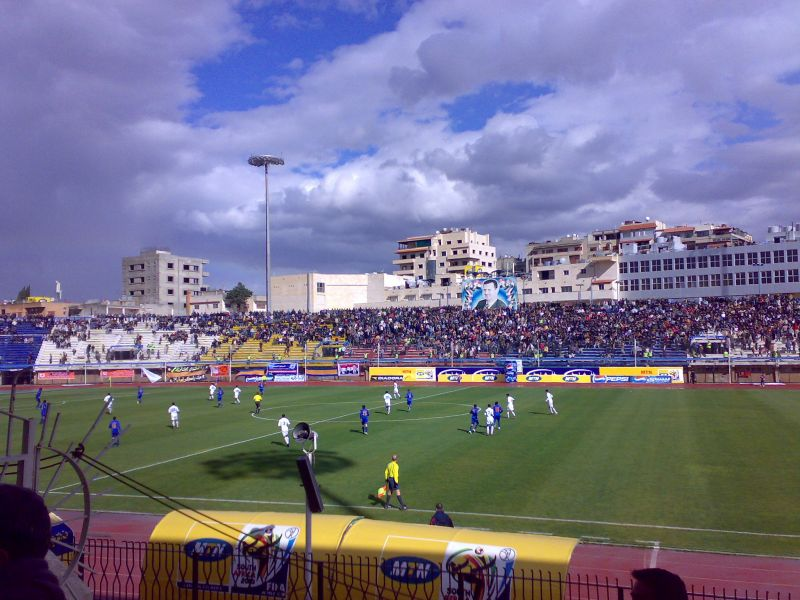
The Khaled Ibn Al Walid Stadium

Homs is home to two football clubs. The Al-Karamah Sports Club was founded in 1928 and is one of the oldest sports clubs in Syria. Al-Karamah is widely acclaimed on the regional and national levels, having won eight Syrian League titles, and eight Syrian Cup titles. Al-Karamah was a runner-up in the 2006 AFC Champions League. The second sports club of the city is Al-Wathba Sports Club, which was founded in 1937. The Khaled ibn al-Walid Stadium has a 35,000-person capacity and is home to both football clubs. Another stadium called Bassel al-Assad Stadium with a capacity of 25,000 was inaugurated in 2000. Homs has produced a number of well-known sportsmen, including footballers Firas Al Khatib and Jehad Al Hussain.

=== Theaters ===
Culture House Theater in Homs was established in 1973. It hosts theatre plays, poetry, instrumental and musical festivals.

== Government ==
Homs is the capital of the Homs District, and the capital of the Homs Governorate—the largest governorate in Syria, and houses the seat of its governor, appointed by the president. The city of Homs is governed by a city council and is home to the Executive Office. The latter consists of nine elected members, in addition to the president of the city council. The Office aids the Governor in making management decisions related to the Governorate, while the city council is responsible for decisions specific to the city of Homs. It is headed by a president, Nadia Kseibi, and is responsible for the day-to-day management of the city.

The council's organizational structure is composed of the top leadership, consisting of the president, vice-president, and secretary, and the lower leadership, made up of the directors of seventeen city branches: Administrative Affairs, Finance, Technical Affairs, Health Affairs, Legal Affairs, the Fire Department, Mechanisms, Parks, Hygiene, Property, Provisional Register, Services and Maintenance, Works, IT, Planning and Statistics, Culture, and Internal Oversight Service.

== Education ==
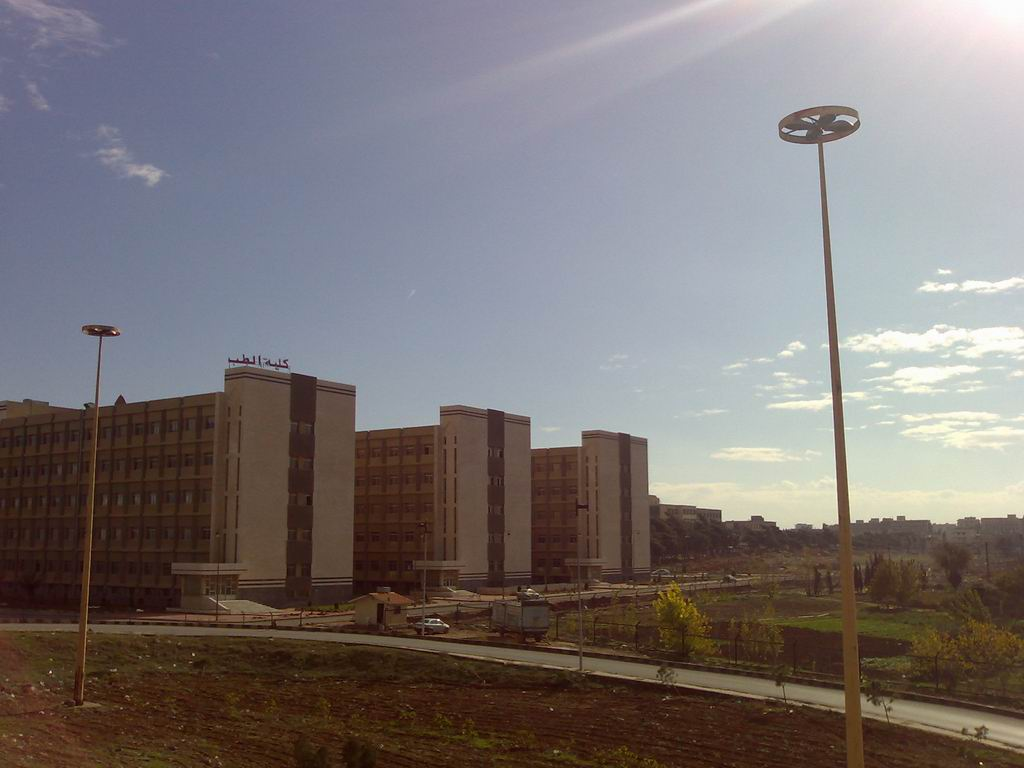
Faculty of Medicine in Homs University

Some of the oldest schools in Homs were founded by American missionaries, the "National Evangelical School" in 1855, and "Al Ghassania Orthodox School" in 1887.

Homs is home to the Homs University (previously Al-Baath University), one of four major universities in Syria was founded in 1979. A specialist engineering foundation, the university has one of the largest student bodies. It houses several faculties including medicine, engineering, liberal arts, and sciences and a number of two-year career (vocational) institutions. It is the only university in the country to have departments in petroleum engineering and veterinary medicine.

The German University at Wadi al-Nasarah opened in 2004 and is located 30 kilometres (19 mi) west of the city. In 2005, the International School of Choueifat opened a school outside the city. Al-Andalus University for Medical Sciences was established in 2005 near Homs, and is constructing one of its University Hospitals in the city.

There are 1,727 schools and 15,000 kindergartens in the Homs Governorate, most of which are public facilities. In 2007, 375,000 students in the governorate were enrolled in elementary schools (6–15 years), 36,000 in high schools (15–18 years), and around 12,000 in vocational training schools.

== Infrastructure ==
=== Transportation ===
Homs is considered a transportation hub in Syria, by virtue of its central location between the coastal cities and the interior. The main bus terminal is Karnak, situated along Hama Street, 1.5 kilometres (0.93 mi) north of the city centre on the outskirts. The terminal offers connections to most Syrian cities and Beirut, Lebanon. It also has international bus connections to Lebanon, Jordan, Saudi Arabia and Turkey. A second "luxury" bus station is located a little further north. Minibuses operate from Karnak station with destinations to Tartus, Palmyra, and Hama in northern Syria, as well as Baalbek, Tripoli, and Beirut in Lebanon. Newer microbuses that mostly travel to Hama are also based in Karnak and are mostly used for quick transportation.

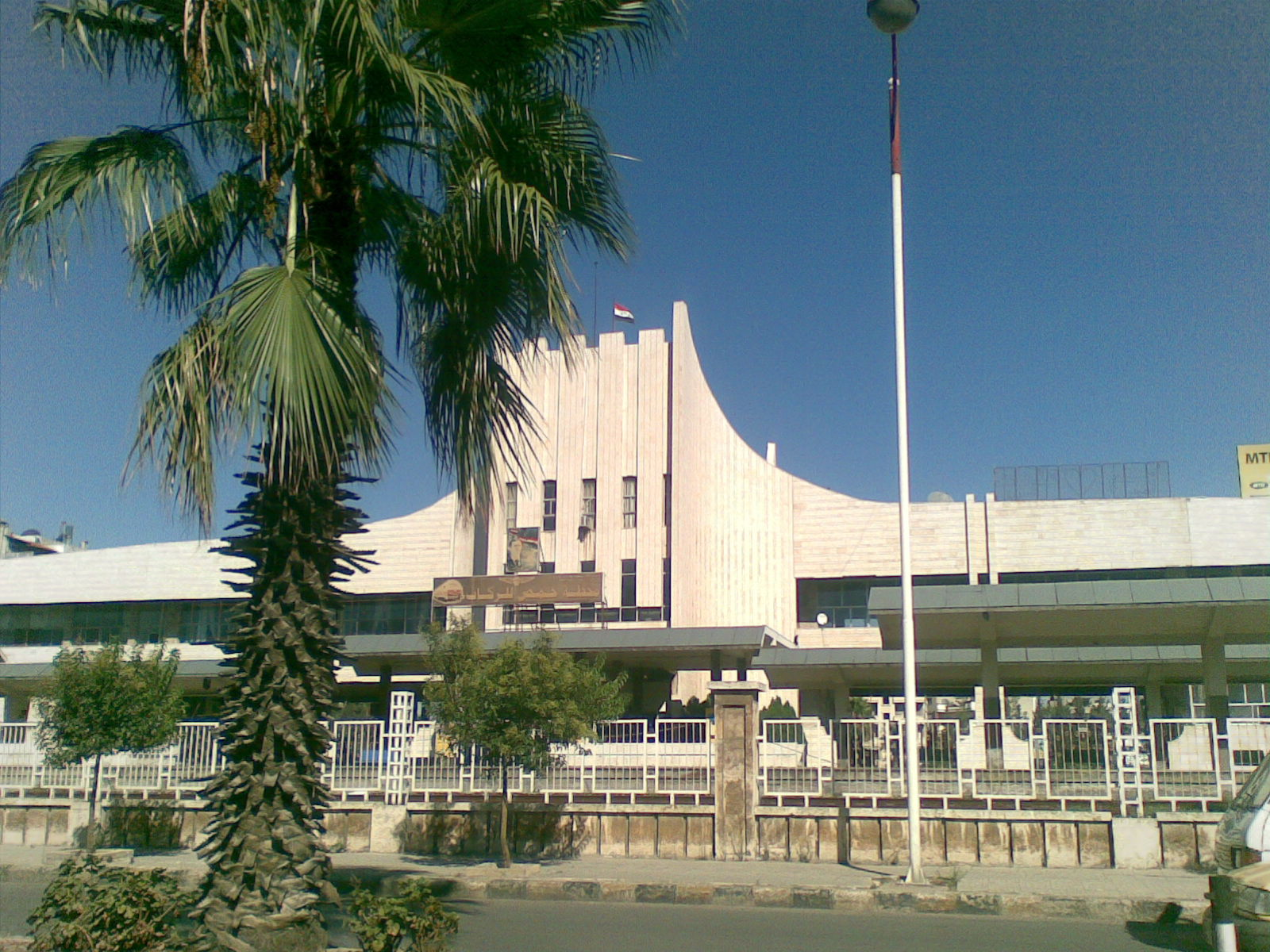
The railway station of Homs

Homs has a large railway station, with two Syrian Railways operated daily departures to Damascus and Aleppo. The nearest airports are Latakia International Airport to the west, Damascus International Airport to the south, Aleppo International Airport to the north, and Palmyra Airport in the Syrian Desert to the east.

Hama Street starts at the Old Clock Square in the city centre and crosses Homs from south to north, where it continues along the neighbourhood of al-Khaldiyah on to the Karnak station, and turns into the Homs-Hama-Aleppo highway. Quwatli Street, named after former president Shukri al-Quwatli, is a short but vital street that connects the Old Clock Square and Quwatli Square in Downtown Homs. It branches into several smaller streets on its western end, one of which is al-Dablan Street which is the main commercial block in the city, and the other continues west to connect with the Homs-Tripoli highway. On the eastern end, al-Quwatli street continues as al-Hamidiyah Street which crosses the old Christian quarter and continues to the eastern edge of the city. The Homs-Damascus highway crosses the city from the south and reaches the city centre in Quwatli Square.

=== Landmarks ===
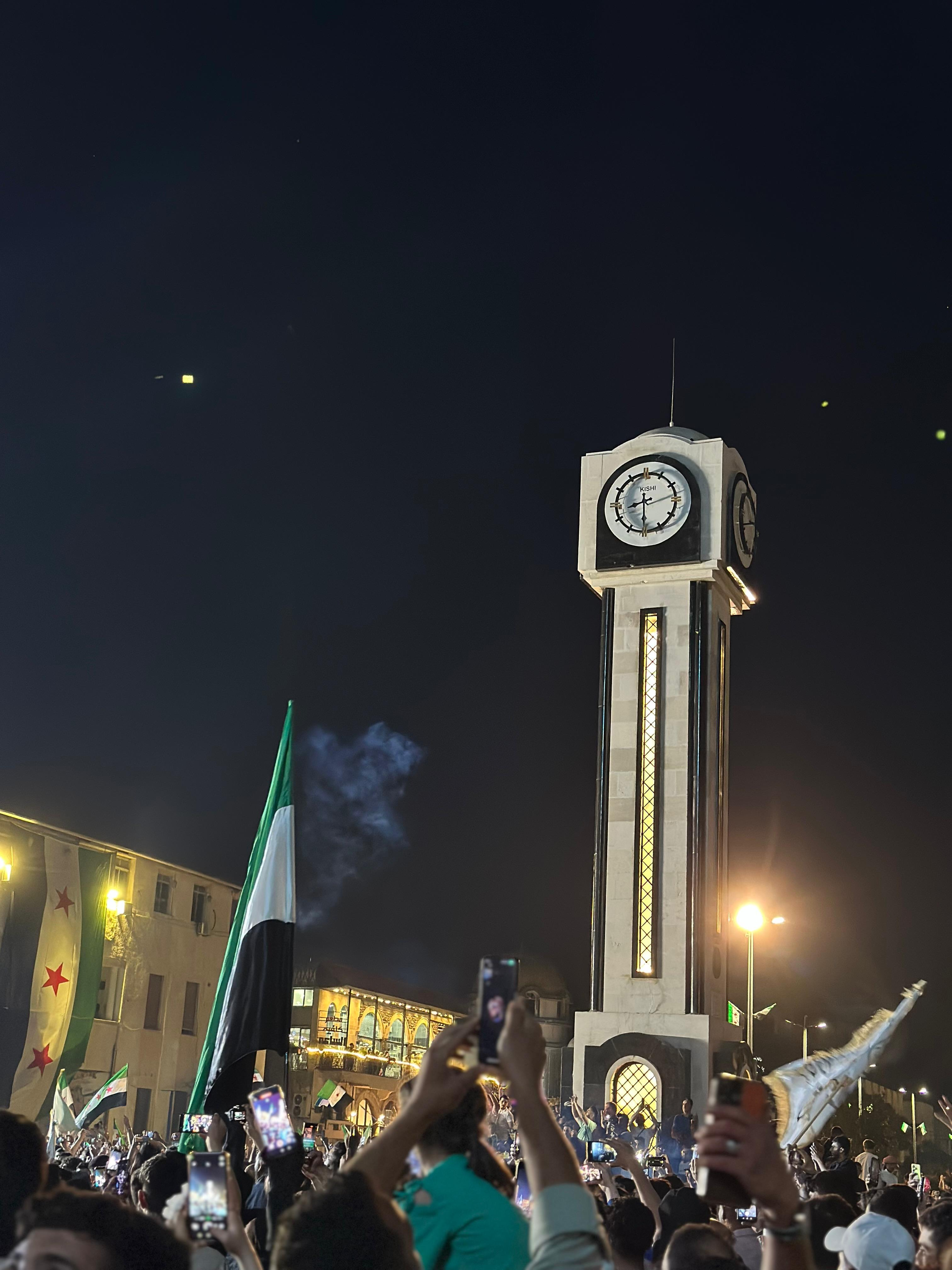
The New Clock Tower, Quwatli Square

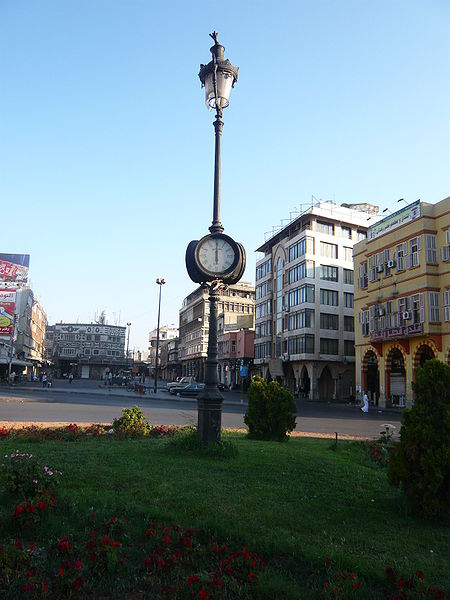
The Old Clock, Martyrs' Square

The city itself is famous for its historic mosques and churches. It is also well recognised by its two public clocks standing at each end of Quwatli Street. The older one, at the eastern end facing al-Hamidiya Street, was elevated by the French in 1923, and the other one, at the western end facing al-Dablan street, is housed in the New Clock Tower which was built in 1957. Homs is well known for its historical roofed souks. These consist of a complex maze of narrow streets and covered commercial alleys extending from the south and east from the Great Mosque towards the ancient citadel. The souks—lined with grocery and clothing stores, and workshops for carpenters, artisans, cobblers, metalworkers and knife-sharpeners—are busiest in the evening.

Other landmarks include the Great Mosque of al-Nuri. Originally a pagan temple dedicated to El-Gabal, it was consecrated as the Church of Saint John the Baptist under the Byzantines. Later, it was established as a Friday mosque during the Islamic Arab rule of Homs. The Khalid ibn al-Walid Mosque has been considered "the only edifice of any real note" in Homs, and was built in the last few years of Ottoman rule in Syria during the 1900s. The mosque is named after early Arab general Khalid ibn al-Walid, whose tomb is located within the building.

The Um al-Zennar Church ("Church of the Virgin's Girdle") was built in 1852 atop an earlier church dating back to the 4th century, and perhaps 59 AD. The other prominent church in Homs is the 5th-century Church of Saint Elian, built in honour of Christian martyr Saint Elian, whose tomb is located in the crypt.

The Citadel of Homs is situated on one of the largest urban tells of Syria. It has been archaeologically neglected because of military occupation until recent years. The tell dates back at least to the Early Bronze Age. The extant Islamic-style walls were built during the Ayyubid period and the Mamluk sultan Baybars subsequently carried out restorations. All of this work is testified by inscriptions although without exception, they are lost. In 1994, a joint Syrian-British team studied the Citadel of Homs, recording the remains of the walls and towers.

== Twin towns – sister cities ==
Homs is twinned with:

- Belo Horizonte, Brazil
- Kayseri, Turkey
- Yazd, Iran

== See also ==
- Cities and towns during the Syrian civil war
- List of cities in Syria
- List of people from Homs
- Timeline of Homs

== Sources ==
- Hogarth, David George (1911). "Homs" . Encyclopædia Britannica. Vol. 13 (11th ed.). p. 648.
- Bosworth, C. Edmund (2007). "Homs". Historic Cities of the Islamic World. Leiden: Koninklijke Brill. ISBN 9789047423836.
- Romane, Julian (2015). Byzantium Triumphant. Pen and Sword Books. ISBN 978-1473845701.
- Seyrig, Henri (1952). "Antiquités Syriennes 53: Antiquités de la Nécropole d'Émèse (1^{re} partie)". Syria. XXIX (3–4): 204–250. doi:10.3406/syria.1952.4788. JSTOR 4390311. Archived from the original on 2 May 2019. (in French)

== Bibliography ==
- Abdulkarim, Maamoun. "Les centuriationes dans la province romaine de Syrie"..
- Albertini, Eugène (1934). "A propos des Numeri syriens". Revue Africaine. 75. Société historique algérienne. OCLC 458398245. Archived from the original on 23 September 2023.
- Al-Dbiyat, Mohamed (5 September 2013). Homs et Hama en Syrie centrale. Presses de l’Ifpo. ISBN 9782351594704. Archived from the original on 23 September 2023..
- Ball, Warwick (2000). Rome in the East: The Transformation of an Empire. Routledge. ISBN 0-415-11376-8. Archived from the original on 23 September 2023..
- Baylson, Joshua C. (1987). Territorial Allocation by Imperial Rivalry: The Human Legacy in the Near East. University of Chicago, Dept. of Geography. ISBN 0-89065-125-6. Archived from the original on 23 September 2023..
- Beattie, Andrew; Pepper, Timothy (2001). The Rough Guide to Syria. Rough Guides. ISBN 1-85828-718-9. Archived from the original on 8 July 2023.
- Besant, Walter (1881). The Survey of Western Palestine: Special Papers on Topography, Archaeology, Manners and Customs, Etc. The Committee of the Palestine Exploration Fund. Archived from the original on 23 September 2023..
- Bryce, Trevor (2014). Ancient Syria: A Three Thousand Year History. Oxford University Press. ISBN 978-0-19-100292-2.
- Carter, Terry; Dunston, Lara; Humphreys, Andrew (2004). Syria & Lebanon. Lonely Planet. p. 300. ISBN 1-86450-333-5.
- Carter, Terry; Dunston, Lara; Thomas, Amelia (2008). Syria & Lebanon. Lonely Planet. ISBN 978-1-74104-609-0. Archived from the original on 23 September 2023.
- Chad, Carlos (1972). Les Dynastes d'Émèse (in French). Dar el-Machreq. Archived from the original on 23 September 2023..
- Cleveland, William L. (2000). A History of the Modern Middle East: 2nd Edition. Westview Press. p. 215. ISBN 978-0-8133-3489-9.
- Commins, David Dean (2004). Historical Dictionary of Syria: 2nd Edition. Scarecrow Press. ISBN 0-8108-4934-8. Archived from the original on 23 September 2023.
- Cook, Thomas (1907). Cook's Handbook for Palestine and Syria. Thos. Cook & Son. p. 362.
- Dumper, Michael; Stanley, Bruce E.; Abu-Lughod, Janet L. (2007). Cities of the Middle East and North Africa: A Historical Encyclopedia. ABC-CLIO. ISBN 978-1-57607-919-5. Archived from the original on 23 September 2023..
- Edwell, Peter (2008). Between Rome and Persia: The Middle Euphrates, Mesopotamia and Palmyra Under Roman Control. Routledge. ISBN 978-1-134-09573-5.
- Fahlbusch, Erwin; Bromiley, Geoffrey William (2008). The Encyclopedia of Christianity: Volume 5: Si-Z. Wm. B. Eerdmans Publishing. ISBN 978-0-8028-2417-2. Archived from the original on 23 September 2023..
- Gil, Moshe (1997). A History of Palestine, 634–1099. Cambridge University Press. ISBN 978-0-521-59984-9. Archived from the original on 23 September 2023..
- Hamilton, Bernard (2000). The Leper King and His Heirs: Baldwin IV and the Crusader Kingdom of Jerusalem. Cambridge University Press. ISBN 978-0-521-64187-6.
- Healy, Mark (1993). Qadesh 1300 B.C, Clash of the Warrior Kings. Osprey Publishing. ISBN 1-85532-300-1.
- Herbermann, Charles George (1913). The Catholic Encyclopedia: An International Work of Reference on the Constitution, Doctrine, Discipline, and History of the Catholic Church. Universal Knowledge Foundation..
- Kennedy, Hugh (2007). The Great Arab Conquests: How the Spread of Islam Changed the World We Live in. Da Capo Press. p. 86. ISBN 978-0-306-81585-0..
- Lewis, Kevin James (2017). The Counts of Tripoli and Lebanon in the Twelfth Century: Sons of Saint-Gilles. Routledge. ISBN 978-1-4724-5890-2.
- Lock, Peter (2006). The Routledge Companion to the Crusades. Routledge. ISBN 9-78-0-415-39312-6.
- Mannheim, Ivan (2001). Syria & Lebanon Handbook: The Travel Guide. Footprint Travel Guides. ISBN 1-900949-90-3. Archived from the original on 23 September 2023.
- Millar, Fergus (1993). The Roman Near East. Harvard University Press. ISBN 9780674778863..
- Room, Adrian (2006). Placenames of the World: Origins and Meanings of the Names for 6,600 Countries, Cities, Territories, Natural Features, and Historic Sites. McFarland. ISBN 0-7864-2248-3. Archived from the original on 23 September 2023..
- Sartre, Maurice (2001). D'Alexandre à Zénobie : Histoire du Levant antique (in French). Fayard. ISBN 9782213640693. Archived from the original on 23 September 2023..
- Seale, Patrick; McConville, Maureen (1990). Asad of Syria: The Struggle for the Middle East. University of California Press. ISBN 0-520-06976-5..
- Seyrig, Henri. "Caractères de l'histoire d'Émèse". Archived from the original on 9 July 2022.
- Shatzmiller, Maya (1994). Labour in the medieval Islamic world. BRILL. ISBN 90-04-09896-8. Archived from the original on 23 September 2023.
- Shaw, Ezel Kural (1977). History of the Ottoman Empire and Modern Turkey. Cambridge University Press. ISBN 0-521-29166-6. Archived from the original on 23 September 2023.
- Strabon (1819). Géographie. Vol. 5. Archived from the original on 23 September 2023.
- le Strange, Guy (1975) [1st pub. 1890]. Palestine Under the Moslems: A Description of Syria and the Holy Land from A.D. 650 to 1500. Committee of the Palestine Exploration Fund. p. 493. ISBN 978-0-404-56288-5..
- Talhami, Ghada Hashem (2001). Syria and the Palestinians. University Press of Florida. ISBN 0-8130-3121-4. Archived from the original on 23 September 2023.
- Wright, Clifford A. (2003). Little Foods of the Mediterranean: 500 Fabulous Recipes for Antipasti, Tapas, Hors d'œuvre, Meze, and More. The Harvard Common Press. ISBN 1-55832-227-2. Archived from the original on 23 September 2023.
- Winckler, Onn (1998). Demographic developments and population policies in Baʻathist Syria. Sussex Academic Press. ISBN 978-1-902210-16-2. Archived from the original on 23 September 2023.
