= Qattinah =

Qattinah قطينة Kattineh
- Village
- Location in Syria
- Coordinates: 34°38′51″N 36°37′40″E
- Country: Syria
- Governorate: Homs
- District: Homs
- Subdistrict: Homs

Population (2004)
  - Total: 6,018
- Time zone: UTC+3 (AST)

Qattinah (Arabic: قطينة, romanized: Qaṭṭīnah, also spelled Kattineh) is a village in central Syria, administratively part of the Homs Governorate, located south of Homs. It is situated at the northeastern end of Lake Homs which is also known as "Lake Qattinah." Nearby localities include al-Buwaydah al-Sharqiyah to the south, Aabel to the east, al-Nuqayrah to the northeast, Tell al-Shur to the north and Khirbet Ghazi to the west on the opposite end of Lake Homs.

According to the Syria Central Bureau of Statistics (CBS), Qattinah had a population of 6,018 in the 2004 census. Its inhabitants are predominantly Christians.

== Bibliography ==
- Al-Dbiyat, Mohammed (1995). Homs et Hama en Syrie centrale: Concurrence urbaine et développement régional (Homs and Hama in Central Syria: Urban Competition and Regional Development) (in French). Presses de l'Ifpo. ISBN 2-901315-26-7.
