= Kafr Aya =

Kafr 'Aya كفر عايا Kfar Aaya, Kafr Aia
- Village
- Location in Syria
- Coordinates: 34°41′5″N 36°41′26″E
- Country: Syria
- Governorate: Homs
- District: Homs
- Subdistrict: Homs

Population (2004)
  - Total: 6,918
- Time zone: UTC+3 (AST)

Kafr 'Aya (Arabic: كفر عايا, also spelled Kfar Aaya or Kafr Aia) is a village in the Homs Governorate in central Syria, just south of Homs. According to the Central Bureau of Statistics (CBS), Kafr 'Aya had a population of 6,918 in 2004. Its inhabitants are predominantly Sunni Muslims.
