= Al-Naim =

Al-Na'im الناعم Al-Naeem
- Village
- Location in Syria
- Coordinates: 34°35′27″N 36°28′54″E
- Country: Syria
- Governorate: Homs
- District: Al-Qusayr
- Subdistrict: Al-Qusayr

Population (2004)
  - Total: 2,290
- Time zone: UTC+3 (EET)
  - Summer (DST): UTC+2 (EEST)

Al-Na'im (Arabic: الناعم; also spelled al-Naeem) is a village in central Syria, administratively part of the Homs Governorate, located southwest of Homs and northwest of al-Qusayr. Just east of the border with Lebanon and on the western shores of Lake Qattinah, nearby localities include al-Aqrabiyah to the south, Tell al-Nabi Mando, Arjoun, al-Houz to the southeast, Kafr Mousa and al-Ghassaniyah to the east, Khirbet Ghazi to the northeast and Wujuh al-Hajar and Liftaya to the north. According to the Syria Central Bureau of Statistics (CBS), al-Na'im had a population of 2,290 in the 2004 census.
