= Qusayr =

Qusayr may refer to:

- Al-Qusayr, Egypt
- Al-Qusayr District, Syria
  - Al-Qusayr, Syria, a city
- Al-Qusayr, Daraa Governorate, a village in southern Syria
- Qusayr, Yemen
- Koz Castle, Turkey, also known as Qusayr
- Qusayr Amra, Umayyad desert castle in Jordan

== See also ==
- Battle of al-Qusayr (2012)
- Al-Qusayr offensive
  - Battle of al-Qusayr (2013)
