= Al-Masriyah =

Al-Masriyah المصرية
- Village
- Location in Syria
- Coordinates: 34°27′52″N 36°29′0″E
- Country: Syria
- Governorate: Homs
- District: Qusayr
- Subdistrict: Qusayr

Population (2004)
  - Total: 618
- Time zone: UTC+2 (EET)
  - Summer (DST): UTC+3 (EEST)

Al-Masriyah (Arabic: المصرية) is a village in central Syria, administratively part of the Homs Governorate, located southwest of Homs and immediately north and south of the border with Lebanon. Nearby localities include Zita al-Gharbiyah to the north, al-Qusayr to the northeast, Zira'a and Rablah. According to the Central Bureau of Statistics (CBS), Al-Masriyah had a population of 618 in the 2004 census. Its inhabitants are predominantly Shia Muslims.
