= Daminah =

Daminah refers to the following villages in the al-Qusayr District, Homs Governorate of Syria:

- Daminah, Hama, a village in Syria's Hama Governorate
- Daminah al-Gharbiyah, a village in Syria's Homs Governorate
- Daminah al-Sharqiyah, a village in Syria's Homs Governorate
