= Tell al-Nabi Mando =

Tell al-Nabi Mando تل النبي مندو قادش Qadesh
- Village
- Location in Syria
- Coordinates: 34°33′9″N 36°31′6″E
- Country: Syria
- Governorate: Homs
- District: al-Qusayr
- Subdistrict: al-Qusayr

Population (2004)
  - Total: 1,068
- Time zone: UTC+3 (EET)
  - Summer (DST): UTC+2 (EEST)

Tell al-Nabi Mando (Arabic: تل النبي مندو), known in archaeological literature as Tell Nebi Mend and also known as Qadesh (Arabic: قادش) after the Bronze-Age city which stood at almost the same location, is a village in central Syria, administratively part of the Homs Governorate, located southwest of Homs. It is situated on the eastern banks of the Orontes River. Nearby localities include al-Houz to the north, Kafr Mousa to the northeast, Arjoun to the east, al-Qusayr to the southeast, Zita al-Gharbiyah to the southwest, al-Aqrabiyah to the southwest and al-Naim to the northwest. According to the Syria Central Bureau of Statistics (CBS), Tell al-Nabi Mando had a population of 1,068 in the 2004 census. The village is adjacent to the ancient site of Qadesh, a name sometimes also used for the village, which abuts it to the north. It is an Alawite village.
