= Hezbollah involvement in the Syrian civil war =

- Part of Foreign involvement in the Syrian civil war, Iran–Saudi Arabia proxy conflict, Iran–Israel proxy conflict in the Iran–Israel conflict during the Syrian civil war, and the Syrian civil war
Date	7 January 2012 – 8 December 2024 (12 years, 11 months and 1 day)
Location	Syria
Result	Syrian opposition victory

Belligerents
Hezbollah Hezbollah militias: Syrian Hezbollah; Quwat al-Ridha; Liwa al-Imam al-Mahdi; Allied militias: PMF Arab Nationalist Guard SSNP Liwa Fatemiyoun Liwa Zainebiyoun; Palestine militias: PFLP-GC (Palestine) Galilee Forces As-Sa'iqa Liwa al-Quds PLA; In Support of: Ba'athist Syria (until 2024); Supported by Russia (until 2024); Iran (until 2024); Iraq (until 2024) Lebanon (until 2024)	Syrian Salvation Government (2017–2024): Hay'at Tahrir al-Sham; Ansar al-Din Front; Ajnad al-Kavkaz; Islamic Front (2012–2015): Ahrar al-Sham; Jaysh al-Islam; Supported by: Qatar; Saudi Arabia (until 2018) Syrian Interim Government: Free Syrian Army; National Front for Liberation; Ahrar al-Sharqiya; Jaysh al-Izza; Supported by: Turkey; United States (until 2018)	Al-Qaeda: Al-Nusra Front; Hurras al-Din; Islamic State

Casualties and losses
- 1,139–1,250 fighters killed by March 2018; 1,736 fighters killed by March 2023 (per SOHR)

Hezbollah involvement in the Syrian civil war has been substantial since the beginning of armed insurgency phase of the Syrian civil war in 2011, and evolved into active support for Syrian government forces and troop deployment from 2012 onwards. By 2014, Hezbollah was deployed across Syria. Hezbollah has also been very active in preventing Al-Nusra Front and Islamic State penetration into Lebanon, being one of the most active forces in the Syrian civil war spillover in Lebanon. Hezbollah's involvement in Syria came to an end with the fall of the Assad regime as a result of a renewed rebel offensive in late 2024, leading to clashes between Hezbollah and the new Syrian transitional government.

In the past, Hezbollah has served a strategic arm of Iran in the region, playing a key role in the Iran–Israel and Iran–Saudi Arabia proxy conflicts. On a number of occasions, Hezbollah weapon convoys in Syria and Syrian-Lebanese border areas were attacked, presumably by the Israeli military. Hezbollah convoys and militant camps have also been attacked by various Syrian rebel factions.

Hezbollah's image in the Arab world – especially in Syria and Lebanon – has been greatly tarnished due to its sectarian activities throughout the course of the Syrian civil war. Major religious leaders and activists, Sunni and Shia alike, have condemned Hezbollah, with many former supporters of Hezbollah becoming its fervent opponents for its stance in Syria. Shi'i cleric Subhi al-Tufayli, the group's founder and principal architect during 1980s, fiercely denounced Hezbollah for abandoning its founding principles and accused it of serving the hegemonic ambitions of Iran and Russia.

== Timeline of Hezbollah deployment in Syria ==
=== 2011–2012 ===
Hezbollah had long been an ally of the Ba'athist government of Syria, ruled by the Assad family. Hezbollah helped the Ba'athist regime during the Syrian civil war in its fight against the Syrian opposition, which Hezbollah described as a "plot to destroy its alliance with al-Assad against Israel". Geneive Abdo opined that Hezbollah's support for al-Assad in the Syrian war had "transformed" it from a group with "support among the Sunni for defeating Israel in a battle in 2006" into a "strictly Shia paramilitary force".

In August 2012, the United States sanctioned Hezbollah for its alleged role in the war. General Secretary Hassan Nasrallah denied Hezbollah had been fighting on behalf of the Syrian government, stating on 12 October 2012 that "right from the start the Syrian opposition has been telling the media that Hezbollah sent 3,000 fighters to Syria, which we have denied". However, according to the Lebanese Daily Star newspaper, Nasrallah said in the same speech that Hezbollah fighters helped the Syrian government "retain control of some 23 strategically located villages [in Syria] inhabited by Shiites of Lebanese citizenship". Nasrallah said that Hezbollah fighters died in Syria doing their "jihadist duties".

In 2013, Hezbollah fighters crossed the border from Lebanon and took over eight villages in the Al-Qusayr District of Syria. On 16–17 February 2013, Syrian opposition groups claimed that Hezbollah, backed by the Syrian military, attacked three neighboring Sunni villages controlled by the Free Syrian Army (FSA). An FSA spokesman said, "Hezbollah's invasion is the first of its kind in terms of organisation, planning and coordination with the Syrian regime's air force". Hezbollah said three Lebanese Shiites, "acting in self-defense", were killed in the clashes with the FSA. Lebanese security sources said that the three were Hezbollah members. In response, the FSA allegedly attacked two Hezbollah positions on 21 February; one in Syria and one in Lebanon. Five days later, it said it destroyed a convoy carrying Hezbollah fighters and Syrian officers to Lebanon, killing all the passengers.

The leaders of the March 14 alliance and other prominent Lebanese figures called on Hezbollah to end its involvement in Syria and said it is putting Lebanon at risk. Subhi al-Tufayli, Hezbollah's former leader, said "Hezbollah should not be defending the criminal regime that kills its own people and that has never fired a shot in defense of the Palestinians". He said "those Hezbollah fighters who are killing children and terrorizing people and destroying houses in Syria will go to hell". The Consultative Gathering, a group of Shia and Sunni leaders in Baalbek-Hermel, also called on Hezbollah not to "interfere" in Syria. They said, "Opening a front against the Syrian people and dragging Lebanon to war with the Syrian people is very dangerous and will have a negative impact on the relations between the two". Walid Jumblatt, leader of the Progressive Socialist Party, also called on Hezbollah to end its involvement and claimed that "Hezbollah is fighting inside Syria with orders from Iran". According to the Jewish Journal of Greater Los Angeles, support for Hezbollah among the Syrian public has weakened since the involvement of Hezbollah and Iran in propping up the Assad regime during the civil war.

According to the U.S., the National Defence Forces (NDF), an Assad loyalist pro-government paramilitary militia and auxiliary force, was created in late 2012 and was maintained by Hezbollah and the Qods Force, the elite special forces branch of Iran's Islamic Revolutionary Guard Corps (IRGC), both of whom supplied the NDF with money, weapons, training and advice.

=== 2013 ===
On 4 April 2013, Hezbollah with the Syrian army launched an offensive to retake part of Qusayr. Syrian Army forces with the help of Hezbollah and the National Defense Forces captured Qusayr extinguishing final rebel resistance after two months of fighting.

On 25 May 2013, Nasrallah announced that Hezbollah is fighting in the Syrian Civil War against Islamic extremists and "pledged that his group will not allow Syrian militants to control areas that border Lebanon". He confirmed that Hezbollah was fighting in the strategic Syrian town of Al-Qusayr on the same side as Assad's forces. In the televised address, he said, "If Syria falls in the hands of America, Israel and the takfiris, the people of our region will go into a dark period." Syrian opposition's National Revolutionary Coation withdrew from the Geneva talks scheduled to be held on June; in denouncement of "Hezbollah and Iran's militia's invasion of Syria".

On 26 May 2013, two rockets hit a Hezbollah area of Beirut injuring five people whilst another two rockets caused property damage to buildings in the al-Hermel district of Beirut. Syrian rebels have been blamed for the attack as they had promised to attack Hezbollah targets in Lebanon in retaliation for their helping the Syrian army particularly in the border town of Al-Qusayr. Syrian rebels have also shelled al-Hermel previously.

On 28 May 2013, Free Syrian Army General Salim Idris gave Hezbollah "24 hours to withdraw from Syria" or he may order FSA units to attack Hezbollah targets in Lebanon.

In early June 2013, Hezbollah committed some 2,000 fighters to the battle in Aleppo, reportedly putting strain on the organisation. Hezbollah changed the rotation policy for its fighters from 7 days fighting followed by 7 days leave, to 20 days fighting followed by 7 days leave. In June 2013, Egyptian President Mohamed Morsi officially demanded the enforcement of a no-fly zone in Syria and condemned Hezbollah by saying,

"We stand against Hezbollah in its aggression against the Syrian people. Hezbollah must leave Syria – these are serious words. There is no space or place for Hezbollah in Syria."

=== 2014 ===
In 2014, Hezbollah's involvement was steady and staunch in support of the Syrian government forces across Syria.

=== 2015 ===
In January 2015, Free Syrian Army groups and al-Qaeda's al-Nusra Front launched an offensive against Hezbollah strongholds in the Jayrud area in the western Qalamoun Mountains, near the Lebanese border. Media sources affiliated with the Syrian opposition report that the joint forces targeted a series of military checkpoints held by Hezbollah in the area surrounding the village of Flaita in Kalamoon. Heavy losses were reported in the ranks of the Syrian security forces and militants of Hezbollah, as the FSA rebels seized a number of heavy and light weapons as well as boxes of ammunition during the operation. At least three FSA fighters were killed. A military official of al-Nusra reported that the ISIS presence in the area has exceeded 700 men, amid fears of escalating violence between both groups.

Israelí media claimed that given that Hezbollah's military involvement faced battles are with Muslims, Hezbollah had emphasized its readiness to wage war against Israel.

In May 2015, Hezbollah forces launches a new offensive in the Qalamoun region in Rif DImashq Governorate, supported by the Syrian Army with the aim of clearing al-Nusra Front and other Syrian opposition forces entrenched in the mountains of the Qalamoun region.

=== 2016 ===
Hezbollah began its participation in the Siege of Deir ez-Zor in 2016.

In May, Hezbollah's top military commander in Syria, Mustafa Badreddine, was killed in murky circumstances near the Damascus International Airport.

=== 2017 ===
Hezbollah participated in the East Aleppo offensive (January–April 2017) and in the Battle of al-Bab against ISIL in February 2017.

Hezbollah played a significant role in the Daraa offensive (February–June 2017), with several casualties. In April, rebels reported that an SAA lieutenant Colonel was executed by the Lebanese Hezbollah militia over charges of 'treason' in al-Manshiya.

In the March 2017 Israel–Syria incident, Israel took responsibility for an airstrike in Syria on a military site near Palmyra that they said was targeting Hezbollah. The Syrian Arab Army reportedly launched S-200 missiles at the Israeli jets, and Israel intercepted one S-200 missile with an Arrow 2 missile.

April 2017 Rif Dimashq airstrike
- Part of Hezbollah involvement in the Syrian Civil War
- Planned by: Israeli Air Force (alleged)
- Objective: Destroy an arms depot operated by Hezbollah
- Date: 27 April 2017; 03:20 EEST (UTC+03:00)
- Executed by: Allegedly Israeli Air Force
- Outcome: Fuel tank and warehouses damaged
- Casualties: 0

The April 2017 Rif Dimashq airstrike was an aerial attack on an arms depot belonging to the Lebanese Shi'a militia Hezbollah. On 27 April 2017, Syria's state-run SANA news agency said that there was an explosion felt in Damascus International Airport at 3:42 am. No casualties were reported. The blast was reportedly felt 15 kilometres (9.3 mi) away. Israeli media said residents in the northern town of Safed reported seeing two missiles being launched and explosions occurring afterwards. Witnesses said a total of five strikes occurred near the airport road. The missiles were so powerful that the impact was felt several kilometres away in the Damascus countryside. According to Al-Manar Television, the Israel Air Force reportedly attacked an Iranian arms depot near the Damascus International Airport early Thursday morning. Various sources have mentioned that the attack was executed around 03:20 EEST. The spokesman for the Israel Defense Forces declined to comment on the airstrike. The Israeli Intelligence Minister Yisrael Katz hinted on possible responsibility for the explosion, telling Army Radio that "The incident in Syria corresponds completely with Israel's policy to act to prevent Iran's smuggling of advanced weapons via Syria to Hezbollah. Two rebel sources told Reuters that "five strikes hit an ammunition depot used by Iran-backed militias." Iranian Defense Minister Hossein Dehghan told Rossiya-24 news channel that Israel "should be disarmed" for the sake of restoring peace and security in the region and that it had [pursued] nothing but war and bloodshed. Kremlin spokesman Dmitry Peskov called for all countries to refrain any kind of actions and respect of Syrian sovereignty in a press conference. Russian Foreign Ministry spokeswoman Maria Zakharova later slammed the strikes by condemning it as an act of aggression against Syria.

On 1 June 2017, it was reported on social media that 3 Hezbollah members, including a Lebanese Hezbollah Field Commander Abdel Hamid Mahmoud Shri (nicknamed Abu Mahdi), had been killed by FSA and ISIS in battles for control of the desert between Syria and Iraq. The same month, Hezbollah participated in the Daraa offensive (June 2017).

On 21 July 2017, Hezbollah and the Syrian army launched an offensive against Hay'at Tahrir al-Sham (HTS) in the area of Juroud Arsal, on the outskirts of the Lebanese town of Arsal, aiming to drive HTS fighters from their last foothold along the Syria-Lebanon border. The offensive was undertaken on two fronts: near Arsal and the Syrian town of Fleita, into a mountainous area where Islamist militants had taken shelter among camps for Syrian refugees.

In the summer and autumn of 2017, Hezbollah played a major role in the pro-government Central Syria campaign (2017). In October, its al-Radhwan forces commander Ali al-Aa'shiq was reported to have been killed by ISIL, along with other Hezbollah fighters, in this campaign.

In September 2017, a Hezbollah commander said the group has 10,000 fighters in southern Syria ready to confront Israel.

In November 2017, Hezbollah spearheaded the pro-government capture of Abu Kamal from ISIL.

In November–December 2017, Hezbollah played a leading role in the Beit Jinn offensive against rebel forces close to the Golan.

=== 2018 ===
In June 2018, Israeli and Syrian opposition media reported that a senior Hezbollah field officer executed 23 Syrian soldiers from the 9th Armoured Division after they refused to cross a bridge which was exposed to rebel fire, and was nicknamed the "Death Bridge", near the town of Hirbat Ghazala, north of the city of Daraa.

=== 2019 ===
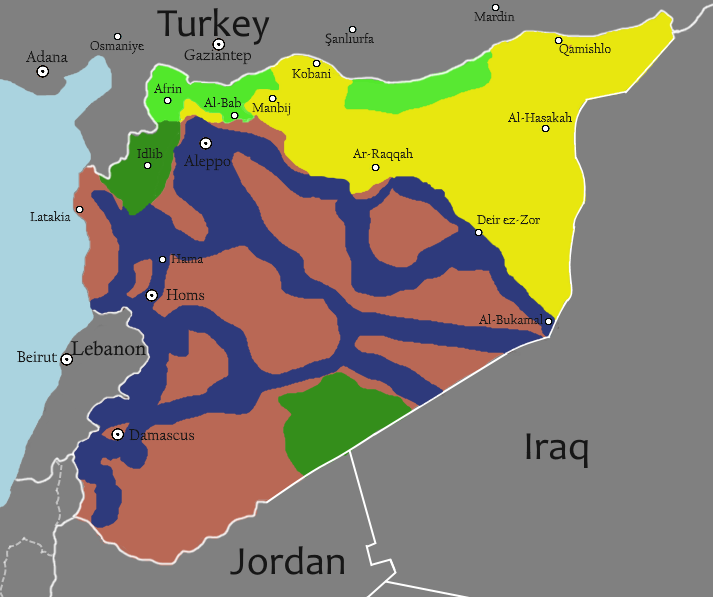
Iranian and Hezbollah's (marked in blue) military presence and influence in Syria as of December 2020.

In early July, Hezbollah began to withdraw from Damascus suburbs and south Syria back to Lebanon.

== Analysis ==
National interest and other Western analysis noted the role of Hezbollah in turning the tides of the Syrian Civil War in favour of the government. After the organization's role in Qusayr, Homs and Aleppo, the armed wing of the Lebanese Party gained political and military experience fighting in urban environments, and enlarged its alliance with Syria and Iran.

Hezbollah's role has been critical in defeating Syrian rebels on behalf of the Syrian government and has grown stronger in the region.

== Incidents involving Hezbollah fighters in Syria ==
Date	Event	Location	Pro-Assad Forces	Anti-Assad Forces	Hezbollah fatalities	Outcome
May 2011-May 2014	Siege of Homs	Homs	Syria; Hezbollah	Free Syrian Army; Al-Nusra Front	Unknown	Major Victory
Jan-Feb 2012	Battle of Zabadani (2012)	Rif Dimashq	Syria; Hezbollah	Free Syrian Army	unknown	Victory
Feb–Apr 2012	Battle of al-Qusayr (2012)	Homs	Syria; Hezbollah	Free Syrian Army	1+	Stalemate
July 2012 – 22 December 2016	Battle of Aleppo	Aleppo	Syria; IRGC; Hezbollah; Badr Organisation	SRCC; Al-Nusra Front	28+	Victory
31 January 2013	January 2013 Rif Dimashq airstrike	Rif Dimashq	Syria; Hezbollah	Allegedly Israeli Air Force	unknown	
April–June 2013	Al-Qusayr offensive	Rif Dimashq	Syria; Hezbollah	Free Syrian Army; Al-Nusra Front	140	Decisive Victory
May 2013	May 2013 Rif Dimashq airstrikes	Rif Dimashq	Syria; Hezbollah	Allegedly Israeli Air Force	unknown	
Nov–Dec 2013	Battle of Qalamoun	Homs	Syria; Hezbollah	Free Syrian Army Al-Nusra Front; Green Battalion ISIL	47–140	Decisive Victory
December 2014	December 2014 Rif Dimashq airstrike	Rif Dimashq	Syria; Hezbollah	Allegedly Israeli Air Force	3	
January 2015	January 2015 Mazraat Amal incident	Quneitra	Hezbollah	Allegedly Israeli Air Force	6	
3 July 2015 – ongoing	Battle of Zabadani (2015)	Zabadani District of the Rif Dimashq Governorate	(Syria) Syrian Arab Republic: Syrian Armed Forces; National Defense Force; Syrian Social Nationalist Party; Hezbollah; Iran: IRGC; Palestine Liberation Army	Jaysh al-Haramoun: al-Nusra Front; Ahrar ash-Sham; Free Syrian Army; Islamic Front (Joined August 15)	60–108 killed	Ceasefire, Significant Gains
October–December 2015	Aleppo offensive (October–December 2015)	Aleppo	Syria; IRGC; Hezbollah; Badr Organisation	SRCC; Al-Nusra Front	unknown	Victory
February 2016	Northern Aleppo offensive (2016)	Aleppo	Syria; Hezbollah; IRGC	al-Nusra Front; SRCC	3	Major Victory
June – 11 September 2016	Aleppo offensive (June–August 2016)	Aleppo	Syria; Hezbollah; IRGC	Ahrar al-Sham	unknown	Major Victory
27 February – 5 March 2020	Operation Spring Shield	Aleppo, Latakia, Idlib, Hama	Syria; Hezbollah; IRGC	Turkey	14	ceasefire

== Criticism ==
Hezbollah's military operations in Syria have been subject to widespread denunciation across the Arab World. Its support in Lebanon has suffered a drastic dent, and opposition has also emerged from its Shia base in Lebanon and beyond. Iraqi Shi'ite cleric Muqtada al-Sadr attacked Hassan Nasrallah's policy for pursuing an Iranian agenda rooted in Shia sectarianism over a Sunni-majority country. Sadrists had long been advocate of activism solely in Shia majority countries. An elder Sadrist leader denounced Hezbollah, accusing it of "killing more Syrians than Israelis".

Influential cleric Yusuf al-Qaradawi, President of the International Union of Muslim scholars, condemned Hezbollah and Iran as enemies of Arabs in October 2012, stating:

"Iran is also our enemy, the enemy of the Arabs. Those killed in Syria have been killed by the Iranians, the Chinese, the Russians, and the Syrian army. The Iranians stand against the Arabs in order to establish a Persian Empire... The same applies to Hezbollah, which sends its men to fight in Syria, and come back in boxes"

Following Hezbollah's 2013 Qusayr offensive across the Lebanese-Syria border, Qaradawi denounced Hezbollah in even more harsh terms; describing it as "the party of Satan" seeking to exterminate Sunni Muslims in the behest of Khomeinist Iran. Qaradawi issued a fatwa for all able-bodied Muslim men to defend the lands of Syria from the aggressions of Ba'athist regime, Iran and Hezbollah.

Qaradawi's change of stance was welcomed by numerous Saudi scholars and intellectuals; including the Grand Mufti of Saudi Arabia, 'Abd al-Azeez Aal al-Shaykh, who re-iterated his condemnation of Hezbollah as sectarian militants who dishonoured "the ties of kinship or covenant with the believers" by collaborating with enemies of Muslims. The Aal sh-Shaykh urged all political leaders, activists and scholars of the Muslim World to raise awareness of Hezbollah activities in Syria and effectively combat it.

Influential Shia cleric Subhi al-Tufayli, founder and first Secretary-General of Hezbollah during 1989–1991, has slammed the militant group for its role in Syrian civil war. Tufayli fiercely denounced the organization as part of an Iranian project that "plagues the Ummah" and accused it of waging a global sectarian war against Sunni brothers on the behest of Ali Khamenei. Describing them as agents of Iran's socio-political monopoly over Lebanese Shi'ites, Tufayli condemned the organization for abandoning its original principles by serving imperialist powers and abetting Russian crimes against the Syrian people. Re-iterating his support for the Syrian revolution, Tufayli stated:

"If there is anyone honorable among you [Hezbollah], then repent and reconsider, Do not be pawns serving the US and Russia. Aleppo today is being destroyed like Berlin. Warplanes never leave its skies, its children are bombed night and day, Whoever allies with these people, American or Russian, I swear to God, he is an enemy."

Tufayli further stated that Hezbollah's actions would be remembered as "one of the most shameful periods in Shia history" and that future generations would curse them for their atrocities. He lambasted the militant group's claims of fighting Islamic State as lies, pointing out that it intervened in Syria far before the emergence of Al-Nusra and IS. Condemning Hezbollah militants for directing most of their attacks against opposition militias fighting IS, Tufayli further cited memories of the brutal Ba'athist occupation of Lebanon which lasted for about 3 decades, emphasizing that Shias in Lebanon are overwhelmingly opposed to Assad family.

== See also ==
- Iranian intervention in the Syrian civil war
- Syrian civil war spillover in Lebanon
