= Al-Sallumiyah =

al-Sallumiyah السلومية
- village
- Location in Syria
- Coordinates: 34.621731°N 36.597489°E
- Country: Syria
- Governorate: Homs
- District: al-Qusayr
- sub-district: al-Qusayr

Population (2004)
  - Total: 725
- City Qrya Pcode: C2752

Al-Sallumiyah (Arabic: السلومية) is a Syrian village located in the al-Qusayr subdistrict of the al-Qusayr district in Homs Governorate. According to the Syrian Bureau of Statistics, the village had a population of 725 in the 2004 census. Its inhabitants were predominantly Sunni Muslims.

== Syrian Civil War ==
Like most Sunni settlements in the al-Qusayr District, al-Sallumiyah was devastated by the al-Qusayr offensive in 2013. As of 2025, the village is in complete ruins, with the mosque the only standing structure remaining.
