= Akkum =

Akkum أكوم Akoum
- Village
- Location in Syria
- Coordinates: 34°31′3″N 36°22′4″E
- Country: Syria
- Governorate: Homs
- District: Qusayr
- Subdistrict: Qusayr

Population (2004)
  - Total: 506
- Time zone: UTC+3 (EET)
  - Summer (DST): UTC+2 (EEST)

Akkum (Arabic: أكوم, also spelled Akoum, also known as Ayn al-Safa) is a village in central Syria, administratively part of the Homs Governorate, located southwest of Homs and immediately north and south of the border with Lebanon. Nearby localities include al-Hawik, Wadi Hanna, Baluzah and al-Aqrabiyah to the east. According to the Central Bureau of Statistics (CBS), Akkum had a population of 506 in the 2004 census. Its inhabitants are predominantly Shia Muslims.
