= Daminah al-Gharbiyah =

Daminah al-Gharbiyah دمينة الغربية Dumaynah Gharbiyah
- Village
- Location in Syria
- Coordinates: 34°36′5″N 36°35′37″E
- Country: Syria
- Governorate: Homs
- District: Al-Qusayr
- Subdistrict: Al-Qusayr

Population (2004)
  - Total: 1,012
- Time zone: UTC+3 (EET)
  - Summer (DST): UTC+2 (EEST)

Daminah al-Gharbiyah (Arabic: دمينة الغربية, also spelled Dumaynah Gharbiyah) is a village in central Syria, administratively part of the Homs Governorate, located southwest of Homs. Nearby localities include Qattinah to the northeast, al-Buwaydah al-Sharqiyah to the east, Daminah al-Sharqiyah to the southeast, al-Dabaah to the south, Arjoun and al-Houz to the southwest and al-Ghassaniyah to the west. According to the Central Bureau of Statistics (CBS), Daminah al-Gharbiyah had a population of 1,012 in the 2004 census.
