= Al-Dabaah =

Al-Dabaah الضبعة Al-Dab'ah
- Village
- Location in Syria
- Coordinates: 34°33′9″N 36°36′44″E
- Country: Syria
- Governorate: Homs
- District: Al-Qusayr
- Subdistrict: Al-Qusayr

Population (2004)
  - Total: 3,129
- Time zone: UTC+3 (EET)
  - Summer (DST): UTC+2 (EEST)

Al-Dabaah (Arabic: الضبعة, also spelled Daba'a) is a village in central Syria, administratively part of the Homs Governorate, located southwest of Homs. Nearby localities include Arjoun to the west, Kafr Mousa and al-Ghassaniyah to the northwest, Daminah al-Gharbiyah to the north, al-Buwaydah al-Sharqiyah and Daminah al-Sharqiyah to the northeast, Shamsin to the east and Jandar to the southeast. According to the Syria Central Bureau of Statistics (CBS), al-Dabaah had a population of 3,129 in the 2004 census.
