= 10th Mechanized Division =

- الفرقة الميكانيكية العاشرة
- Syrian Armed Forces Flag
- Active: 1973 – 2024
- Country: Ba'athist Syria (surrendered)
- Allegiance: Syrian Arab Armed Forces (surrendered)
- Branch: Syrian Arab Army (surrendered)
- Type: Mechanized Infantry
- Role: Conventional warfare
- Size: up to 10,000 soldiers (2019)
- Part of: 2nd Corps (surrendered)
- Garrison/HQ: Qatana
- Engagements: Lebanese Civil War; 1982 Lebanon War; Islamist uprising in Syria; 1982 Hama massacre; Syrian Civil War; Idlib Governorate clashes (September 2011 – March 2012); Battle of al-Qusayr (2012); Rif Dimashq offensive (November 2012–February 2013); Damascus offensive; Battle of al-Qusayr (2013); Ithriyah-Raqqa offensive (June 2016); Palmyra offensive (December 2016); East Hama offensive (2017); Battle of Harasta (2017–2018); Siege of Eastern Ghouta; Rif Dimashq offensive (February–April 2018); As-Suwayda offensive (August–November 2018)

Commanders
- Current Commander: Maj. Gen. Hossem Salah
- Notable commanders: Maj. Gen. Mohammed Dib Zaitoun; Maj. Gen. Hassan Saado †; Maj. Gen. Muhammad Ibrahim Issa

The 10th Mechanized Division (Arabic: الفرقة الآلية العاشر) was a division of the Syrian Arab Army and part of the 2nd Corps. This was one of the smallest divisions in the SAA and its origins dated back to 1973.

== Command structure ==
10th Mechanized Division (2022)

- 18th Mechanized Brigade
- 62nd Mechanized Brigade
- 51st Armored Brigade
- 58th Armored Brigade
- 122nd Artillery Regiment

== Combat history ==
=== 1982 Lebanon War ===
In the 1982 Lebanon War, the 10th Armoured Division was deployed south of the Beirut-Damascus road, and inside Beirut, and consisted of the 76th and 91st Tank Brigades – equipped with T-62s and BMP-1s – and the 85th Mechanized Brigade, equipped with T-55s and BTR-60s. The division was also assigned control of the 20th Commando Battalion as well.

In the same year, the division was returned to Syria, and participated in the suppression of the Muslim Brotherhood Rebellion. The division was also reported to have taken place in the 1982 Hama massacre. After that, the division was returned to Lebanon, and remained there until the withdrawal of the Syrian army from the country in 2005.

In 2001 Richard Bennett's estimate of the Army order of battle reported that the 10th Mechanized Division was headquartered in Shtoura, Lebanon, part of the 2nd Corps. Its main units were in 2001 deployed to control the strategic Beirut-Damascus highway with the 123rd Mechanized Brigade near Yanta, the 51st Armored Brigade near Zahlé in the Beqaa Valley and the 85th Armored Brigade, deployed around the complex of positions at Dahr al-Baidar.

=== Syrian Civil War ===
In Syria, the division was reported to have become involved in the two battles in al-Qusayr starting on 19 May 2013, as part of the larger al-Qusayr offensive, launched in early April 2013 by the Syrian Army and the Lebanese militia Hezbollah, with the aim of capturing the villages around the rebel-held town of al-Qusayr and ultimately launching an attack on the town itself. al-Qusayr is in Homs Governorate, near the border with Lebanon. The region was strategically important as a supply route for rebels fighting Syrian government forces in Homs, and for its proximity to government-supporting areas along the coast. In course of the Ithriyah-Raqqa offensive in 2016, the division's chief-of-staff, Major General Hassan Saado, was killed. Since 2019, elements of the division are being trained by Russian officers in Safita, Tartous.

The 58th Brigade had not existed in any meaningful way since at least late 2016 and the 85th Brigade was moved to the newly formed 6th Division in 2015. The 51st Armored Brigade was formed after 2011 as a new armored unit under the command of the 10th Division. The 18th Brigade had moved to the Republican Guard by late 2018. In 2021, the 18th Brigade, formerly part of the 30th Division, was brought back to the late unit.
