= Battle of al-Qusayr =

During the Syrian Civil War, two battles have occurred in and around the city of al-Qusayr:

- The First Battle of al-Qusayr, occurring between February and April 2012, which ended in a stalemate
- The Second Battle of al-Qusayr, part of the 2013 al-Qusayr offensive, in which the Syrian Armed Forces and Hezbollah recaptured the city.
