= Al-Qusayr offensive =

Military operation

- Part of the Syrian civil war
- Map showing the offensive
Date	4 April – 8 June 2013 (2 months and 4 days)
Location	Al Qusayr and its district, Syria
Result	Decisive Syrian Army & Hezbollah victory
Territorial changes	Syrian Army and Hezbollah capture all villages around al-Qusayr; Lebanon–Syria border comes under the control of the Syrian government and Hezbollah; Syrian Army and Hezbollah capture Al-Qusayr

Belligerents
(Syrian opposition) Free Syrian Army; Syrian Islamic Front; Al-Nusra Front	(Syria) Syrian Arab Republic; Syrian Arab Armed Forces; National Defense Forces; Popular Committees; Hezbollah; Iran: IRGC

Commanders and leaders
Lt. Col. Mohieddin al-Zain (al-Qusayr military council); Abdul Qader Saleh (WIA) (Al-Tawhid Brigade commander)	Abu Jihad (Hezbollah commander); Fadi al-Jazar † (Hezbollah commander); Qasem Soleimani (Quds force commander)

Units involved
(Syrian opposition) Free Syrian Army; (Syrian opposition) Farouq Brigades; (Syrian opposition) Al-Tawhid Brigade; Syrian Islamic Front; Kata’ib Ahrar Al-Sham	1st Armoured Division; 10th Mechanized Division; Unit 910 (Hezbollah)

Strength
1,900 fighters	5,000–6,000 soldiers and militia, 1,700–2,000 Hezbollah fighters 40 tanks

Casualties and losses
740–809 killed	330 killed (140 Hezbollah)

The al-Qusayr offensive was an operation by the Syrian Government forces against Opposition forces at al-Qusayr in Homs province, during the Syrian Civil War. The operation was launched on 4 April 2013. The Syrian Army, the Lebanese militia Hezbollah and the National Defense Forces played key roles in the attack. Its aim was to capture all villages around the rebel-held town of al-Qusayr, thus tightening the siege of the city and ultimately launching an attack on al-Qusayr itself. The region was an important supply route for rebels fighting Syrian government forces in Homs.

== Background ==
Beginning in November 2011, al-Qusayr was besieged by the Syrian Army. At least 66 residents of the city were believed to have been killed in the conflict before heavier fighting began in February 2012.

The importance of the town is magnified by its location next to Lebanon and as a weapons smuggling route. It also allows for the control of the border with Lebanon and the Lebanese village of al-Qasr. More importantly, it is the location of the highway from Damascus to Homs. From the view of the government, holding access to the road would have forced opposition fighters from their strongholds in Homs by cutting supply routes. It was also the location for the main road to Tartous, which has a heavy Alawite presence.

The exact details of which individuals and institutions oversaw the planning of the operation are less than clear, however, the commander of the Quds force Qasem Soleimani has been reported to be the mastermind behind the Al-Qusayr offensive. "The whole operation was orchestrated by Suleimani. ... It was a great victory for him".

== The offensive ==
=== Fighting in the countryside ===
On 11 April, the Syrian Army, along with a large force of Hezbollah fighters, attacked and captured the strategic hilltop village of Tell al-Nabi Mando from rebel forces. Fighting still continued into the next day but it was described as sporadic. 40 Hezbollah militiamen and Syrian soldiers were killed in the fierce battle for the hill. The importance of Tell al-Nabi Mando is in its strategic location. The force which controls Tell al-Nabi Mando can fire on most border villages in the area. Because of this, people from pro-government villages fled after the opposition had previously captured the hill.

On 14 April, after previously warning Lebanon that it would retaliate for Hezbollah's participation on the side of Syrian government forces, rebels launched a rocket attack over the border against the Lebanese towns of Hermel and al-Qasr, killing two Lebanese, including a child, and injuring six others.

On 17 April, government bombardment of al-Buwaydah al-Sharqiyah killed at least 12 people, including two women and two children. Meanwhile, fighting raged on the outskirts of the town Abil. Opposition activists reported that 700 Hezbollah militiamen were deployed in the town of al-Nazariyeh near al-Qusayr.

On 18 April, the FSA took control of al-Dab'a Air Base near the city of al-Qusayr. The base had no aircraft and was being used primarily to garrison ground troops. Meanwhile, the Syrian Army took control over the town of Abel. The SOHR director described the Army takeover of the town by saying that it will hamper rebel movements between al-Qusayr and Homs city. According to him, the capture of the airport would have relieved the pressure on the rebels in the area, but their loss of Abel made the situation more complicated. 21 rebel fighters, including one commander, were killed during the fighting for Abel.

On 20 April, government and Hezbollah troops captured the village of Radwaniyeh, tightening the siege of al-Qusayr. Opposition activists stated that coordination between the military and Hezbollah was very strong and Hezbollah fighters were provided air-cover during their advance. A Hezbollah assault on Burhaniya had also started. Fresh fighting was also reported at Tell al-Nabi Mando, with other clashes raging in the villages of Saqraja and Abu Huri. One activist from al-Qusayr described the situation as very bad with the government forces trying to capture the countryside around the city, in order to attack the city itself.

On 21 April, Burhaniya and Saqraja were also captured in the government advance and the Army secured the road linking the Lebanese-Syrian border along the Orontes river to the west of al-Qusayr. At the same time, a new round of rebel rocket strikes hit the Lebanese towns of Hermel and al-Qasr, in retaliation for the Hezbollah participation in the offensive. By this point, eight villages had fallen to the government offensive. Hezbollah forces were advancing from the Bekaa valley toward al-Qusayr, while the Syrian Army was moving south from Homs in a pincer movement.

On 22 April, fighting continued between rebels and Hezbollah forces in other villages around al-Qusayr. Rebels alleged that 18 Hezbollah fighters were killed in the clashes. A rebel commander claimed that rebels recaptured the villages of Abou Houri and Al-Mouh. However, there was no independent confirmation.

On 23 April, more rebel rocket strikes hit the Lebanese town of Hermel, as a Syrian military source insisted that the capture of al-Qusayr was "just days away, at most".

By 24 April, the front line had moved to the village of Ayn al-Tannur, a few miles northwest of al-Qusayr. Government forces were waiting until their positions in the villages west of the Orontes River were reinforced before they advanced on al-Qusayr.

On 26 April, according to the SOHR, very heavy fighting took place on the road from Homs to the coast. Also, clashes were ongoing in the village of Kamam, between Homs and al-Qusayr, as rebels were making attempts to capture it.

On 29 April, six rockets from Syria hit Macharih el-Qaa in the Bekaa valley, in Lebanon, injuring one person.

On 2 May, clash took place in the Jusiya area near the Lebanese border between rebels and the Syrian army, as well as pro-government militiamen, who also include Hezbollah members.

On 4 May, according to SOHR, the orchard area surrounding al-Qusayr was seeing fighting between the Army and rebel forces. Several parts of al-Qusayr were under bombardment. The clashes left five rebels dead, including a rebel commander. Fighters from Hezbollah's elite forces also participated in the clashes and were able to take control of most of the villages surrounding the city in the previous days.

On 5 May, al-Qusayr was bombed by the Army while fighting raged on the edge of the town. The opposition SNC called for rebel reinforcements to be sent to al-Qusayr. Iranian Press TV reported that the military had captured the last major rebel stronghold east of the city, Tal Hanash, and thus completing the encirclement of al-Qusayr.

On 6 May, clash took place on the edge of the town of al-Sloumiya and a rocket fired from Syria towards Lebanon fell on al-Qasr in Hermel, six others fell between Dabbabiya and Noura in Akkar. Fighting was also ongoing for a second day on the outskirts of al-Qusayr.

By 7 May, rebels stated they were in danger of losing al-Qusayr after being swept from the surrounding villages.

On 8 May, heavy fighting continued in al-Qusayr, with mediation underway between government forces and some local "elements" to make the rebels withdraw from the town although many were still refusing to leave. There were unconfirmed reports that Hezbollah forces had massacred 30 people who were attempting to leave the city and taken their bodies away.

On 9 May, the Syrian army took control of Shumariyeh, near al-Qusayr, and continued to advance towards the village of Ghassaniyeh. Meanwhile, three shells from Syria hit Hermel, in Lebanon, and two others fell on Macharia al-Qaa.

On 10 May, according to a military source, the Army dropped leaflets over the city warning citizens to evacuate al-Qusayr ahead of an assault. An opposition activist, who toured two villages on the edge of the town, denied this stating no leaflets were dropped. However, a local resident who lives near al-Qusair confirmed the leaflet drop. Hezbollah shelling of the city hit the main water tank and filtration station. By this point, an estimated 25,000 civilians remained in the city. It was also reported that three Lebanese rebel fighters were killed in the fighting in the area and another 36 were missing.

On 11 May, rebels recaptured Abel, potentially easing the movements of opposition forces between al-Qusayr and Homs. However, the military captured it once again the very next day. During their advance, the Syrian army managed to break the siege of the Christian village of Ghassaniyeh. The village was besieged by rebel forces for eight months.

On 13 May, government forces captured the towns of Damina al-Gharbiyah, Haidariyeh and Ish al-Warwar, north of al-Qusayr, allowing them to block supplies to the rebels in the city. This left only three more targets the military needed to capture before reaching the northern outskirts of al-Qusayr, including the Al-Dab'a Air Base which the rebels captured the previous month, before completely surrounding the city. The army had already secured the southern and eastern approaches to al-Qusayr and another force was advancing from the west of the town.

On 18 May, the rebels ambushed Hezbollah fighters along the banks of the Assi river on the Syrian side of the Lebanese border while they attempted to enter Syria. 10 Hezbollah militiamen were killed. Still, by early next morning, a new Hezbollah force was reportedly heading towards al-Qusayr. On the night of 18 to 19 May, heavy fighting raged between the Army and the rebels around the al-Dab'a Air Base. The Army also bombarded the rebel-held village of Boueida al-Sharqiya.

=== Battle of al-Qusayr ===
On 19 May, after two days of calm, planes, artillery and mortars bombarded al-Qusayr in the early hours of the morning. Later in the day, government troops, backed-up by hundreds of Hezbollah militiamen, stormed the city from several directions. Clashes at nine points in and around al-Qusayr were reported during the day.

Syrian troops entered the center of the city later in the day, seizing the town's main square and its municipality building, a military source said. One opposition activist denied that government forces made gains, but another opposition activist confirmed the Army had captured the municipality building and were in control of 60% of the city.

By the second day of the battle, state media claimed they had restored "stability" in the town's east, and was still hunting "remnants of terrorists" in some northern and eastern areas. An opposition source also reported the fighting to be concentrated in the northern part of the city.

SOHR said there were conflicting reports as to whether or not the Syrian army was fighting inside al-Qusayr city, but had reports which confirmed that they were gathering near the western neighborhood of al-Qusayr "in order to lay siege on the city itself". Thick black smoke could also be seen from the direction of the air base, north of the city, as government troops fought to retake the facility.

Activists in Qusayr claimed that government and Hezbollah forces had been pushed back to their starting positions on the outskirts of the city, while a FSA spokesman claimed that the government force's efforts to enter the city were being blocked by the FSA. Another opposition activist once again reaffirmed that government forces had captured the municipality building and the city center and had pushed out rebel units out of most of al-Qusayr. An Al Jazeera reporter in Beirut also said that it seemed that the Army had control of most of the town.

On the third day of the fighting, elite Hezbollah reinforcements were sent from Lebanon across the border to al-Qusayr. SOHR had also confirmed, for itself, for the first time that fighting was raging in the city itself. The clashes had spread to the border village of Hit, where two rebels were killed and several wounded.

On 22 May, George Sabra, president of the SNC, issued a call for reinforcements to be sent to al-Quasyr stating "Everyone who has weapons or ammunition should send them to Qusair and Homs to strengthen its resistance". The Islamic Tawheed Brigade reportedly sent a convoy of 30 vehicles to al-Quasyr from Aleppo. Later, Abu Firas of the Tawid brigade claimed that a total of 300 support units arrived in al-Qusayr, adding that they also sent an ambulance, an antiaircraft weapon and ammunition. Days later, an opposition activist denied any reinforcements had arrived in al-Qusayr, stating that "No one is helping Qusair other than its own men". One rebel source said government and Hezbollah forces had cut most of the oppositions overland supply lines into al-Qusayr and some others reaffirmed that they believe government troops had captured about 60 percent of the city, while a government official claimed they controlled up to 80 percent of the city.

Government troops were advancing cautiously amid heavy fighting which largely destroyed the city. Morale among Army personnel was reportedly high as "news broke" about the killing of al-Nusra Front commander Abu Omar. Military commanders on the ground said that battle for al-Qusayr was far from over and it could take one more week to retake the northern part of al-Qusayr where rebels were entrenched. Meanwhile, opposition forces were still holding the al-Dabaa air base.

The military reported that they killed 100 rebel fighters on the first day of the battle for the city. The opposition activist group SOHR stated that 76 rebels, 31 Hezbollah fighters, 12 government soldiers and militiamen and eight civilians were killed during the first three days of the fighting. Per other opposition activist estimates: 90 rebels, 30 Hezbollah fighters and 20 government soldiers and militiamen were killed during the first two days. Lebanese sources stated that 12-20 Hezbollah members were killed.

By the fourth day of the fighting, 89 rebels had been killed, including six Lebanese. On the fifth day, the number of Hezbollah fighters dead had risen to 46.

It was reported on 24 May that government forces were advancing in the nearby town of Hamdiyeh, in an attempt to cut the opposition forces' last supply line into al-Qusayr. An Army officer stated that the rebels were confined in a triangle linking Arjun, al-Dabaa and the northern part of al-Qusayr. A large force of rebels had retreated to the al-Dabaa air base. The approach of the Army was described as being slow and methodical, taking over small bit of ground from rebels and consolidating it before advancing again. Very few reinforcements reached the rebels, due to the control of surrounding roads by the government.

On 25 May, government and Hezbollah forces had also reportedly breached rebel defence lines at the al-Dabaa air base from the northwest and entered the facility where fighting was ongoing, according to the Army. SOHR reported that the fighting was taking place around the base, while rebels were still maintaining control of it, though it was being heavily shelled by government forces.

On 27 May, Army and Hezbollah troops captured the town of Hamidiya after heavy clashes. The fighting than shifted to the village of Haret al-Turkumen, which the Army was trying to capture in order to put al-Qusayr under "complete siege." An opposition activist said that government forces had captured two-thirds of al-Qusayr, while another activist said the Army was preventing rebel reinforcements from reaching the city. The reinforcements, who were trying to relieve the pressure on al-Qusayr, were bogged down on the outskirts of the city. Also, a Lebanese woman was killed in a rebel mortar attack on the Hezbollah stronghold of Hermel.

On 29 May, state media reported that government troops had captured the air base after five hours of fighting in and around it. Hezbollah's Manar TV aired footage, relayed from its TV crew embedded with government troops, of tanks being deployed inside the air base and soldiers walking around empty hangars. Syrian Army forces were then reportedly advancing on the nearby town of Dabaa. SOHR and a spokesman for the rebel Farouq Battalions confirmed the capture of the air base the next day.

On 30 May, government troops had captured the village of A'rjoun, six kilometers to the northwest of al-Qusayr, thus leaving rebels in a situation with little chance of escaping from the northern part of al-Qusayr. The same day, 300 rebels managed to reinforce al-Qusayr, breaking through Army lines at the village of Shamsinn. 11 rebels were killed during the breakthrough. However, despite this, rebel general Selim Idris stated that rebels in the city were "heavily outgunned and overwhelmed" by government forces and warned of defeat if the West did not react to help them.

On 31 May, the Army captured the village of Jawadiyeh outside al-Qusayr, closing all entrances leading to the town and tightening the government's siege.

On 5 June, Syrian state TV reported that the Syrian Army gained full control of the city. The rebels stated that they had pulled out of the city. One Hezbollah fighter said that they took the town in a rapid overnight offensive, allowing some of the rebels to retreat. A source close to the Syrian military said that the Army was carrying out mop-up operations in the northern quarter of al-Qusayr. The rebels had reportedly retreated north to the village of Dabaa, which was still partially under rebel control.

More than 500 rebels were killed and 1,000 wounded during the battle, out of a force of 1,900 fighters. 70–110 Hezbollah fighters were killed, according to opposition sources, of which at least 100 were confirmed by a Hezbollah fighter. An unknown number of Syrian Army soldiers were killed.

=== Mopping-up operations ===
On 6 June, government forces shelled the village of Buwaydah, where most rebels from al-Qusayr had retreated, although some remained in the orchards around al-Qusayr and in Dabaa. Later in the day, the Syrian Army captured Dabaa.

The next day, SOHR reported that fighting was still ongoing on the outskirts of Dabaa. Artillery attacks against Buwaydah were also still continuing. At least a dozen refugees from al-Qusayr were killed during Army shelling of the surrounding orchards. Later in the day, government forces captured the nearby villages of Salhiyeh and Masoudiyeh. With the capture of the villages, government forces advanced to the edge of Buwaydah. According to state TV, troops broke into the village later that night and were pursuing the rebels there.

On 8 June, Buwaydah was captured by government forces, thus making the whole of the al-Qusayr region come under government control. Rebels in Buwaydah suffered heavy losses during the final assault and dozens of rebels, including a number of foreign fighters, were captured alive. Rebels claimed that during the day the Army attacked a refugee column of 2,000 people, which included rebel fighters and civilians, who were surrounded in the orchards around al-Qusayr. A rebel spokesman claimed that 110 people, including 40 women and children and 20 rebel fighters, were killed.

== Strategic importance ==
Location of al-Qusayr

The main aim of the offensive to capture the al-Qusayr area, and thus most of Homs province, was seen by some as possible preparations for three things. One, to establish a corridor from Damascus to the Mediterranean coast, which is the Alawite heartland, and thus laying the groundwork for a possible new state, which would include about a third of Syria. Or two, securing a withdrawal route in case government forces abandon Damascus and decide to retreat to the coast. Or three, to secure the supply route for a final counterattack towards Homs. The city of al-Qusayr is "crucial to supply routes for both sides".

== See also ==
- Damascus offensive
