= Shamsin =

Shamsin شمسين Shemsin
- Location in Syria
- Coordinates: 34°32′29″N 36°44′26″E
- Country: Syria
- Governorate: Homs
- District: Homs
- Subdistrict: Hisyah

Population (2004)
  - Total: 811
- Time zone: UTC+3 (EET)
  - Summer (DST): UTC+2 (EEST)

Shamsin (Arabic: شمسين, romanized: Shamsīn, also spelled Shemsin, Shamsinn or Shimsan) is a village in central Syria, administratively part of the Homs Governorate, located south of Homs. Nearby localities include al-Qusayr to the west, Damina al-Sharqiya to the northwest, Shinshar to the north, Dardaghan to the southeast and Hisyah to the south. According to the Syrian Central Bureau of Statistics (CBS), Shamsin had a population of 811 in the 2004 census. Its inhabitants are predominantly Sunni Muslims.

== History ==
In 1226, during Ayyubid rule, Syrian geographer Yaqut al-Hamawi visited Shamsin, noting it was "a place between Hims (Homs) and Kara." Under the Ayyubids and later the Mamluks who gained power in 1250, Shamsin was part of Mamlakat Hims ("Kingdom of Homs"), the smallest district in both sultanates.

In the mid-19th-century, Shamsin was described as "a small place" by German traveler Albert Socin. During this period, the village was walled and referred to as the site of an old khan (caravanserai). It was populated by a few families, while the surrounding areas were dominated by the nomadic `Anizzah tribe.

== Bibliography ==
- Socin, A. (1876). Palestine and Syria, Handbook for Travellers. Karl Baedeker.
- Park, E. A. (1854). The Bibliotheca Sacra and American Biblical Repository. Vol. 11. W. F. Draper.
- Le Strange, G. (1890). Palestine Under the Moslems: A Description of Syria and the Holy Land from A.D. 650 to 1500. London: Committee of the Palestine Exploration Fund. OCLC 1004386.
- Robinson, E.; Smith, E. (1841). Biblical Researches in Palestine, Mount Sinai and Arabia Petraea: A Journal of Travels in the year 1838. Vol. 3. Boston: Crocker & Brewster.
