= Nizariyya (disambiguation) =

The Nizariyya (Arabic: نزارية) are the largest modern branch of Isma'ilism.

The term can also refer to:

- Al-Nizariyah, village in central Syria
- term for the northern Arab tribes descended from Nizar ibn Ma'ad
