= Bana al-Abed =

Syrian Twitter user (born 2009)

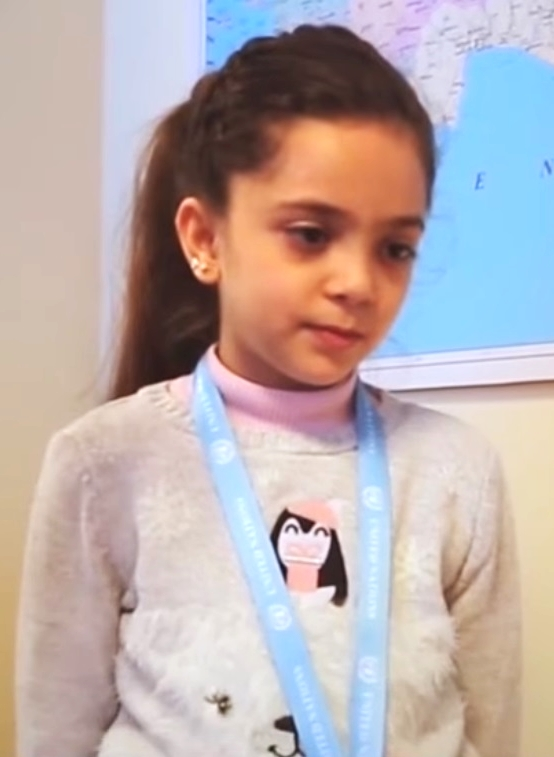
- al-Abed as a refugee in Turkey in 2017
- Born: 7 June 2009 (age 17); Aleppo, Syria
- Years active: 2016–present
- Known for: Tweeting about war in Aleppo

Bana al-Abed (Arabic: بانا العبد; born 7 June 2009) is a Syrian girl from Aleppo, Syria who, with assistance from her English-speaking mother, sent messages through Twitter documenting the siege of the city. Most of these tweets have documented issues such as airstrikes, destruction, hunger, displacement, the prospect of her and her family's death, her longing for a peaceful childhood, the al-Bab district of eastern Aleppo, and her general calls for peace.

Al-Abed's Twitter account, @AlabedBana, had been created on 24 September 2016. Twitter has verified Al-Abed's account, indicating that "an account of public interest is authentic." The account has nearly 370,000 followers, and is managed by Bana's mother Fatemah. On 4 December 2016, during the 17th Aleppo offensive, her account was taken down, but it was back up within two days and the account has been tweeting since.

== Life ==
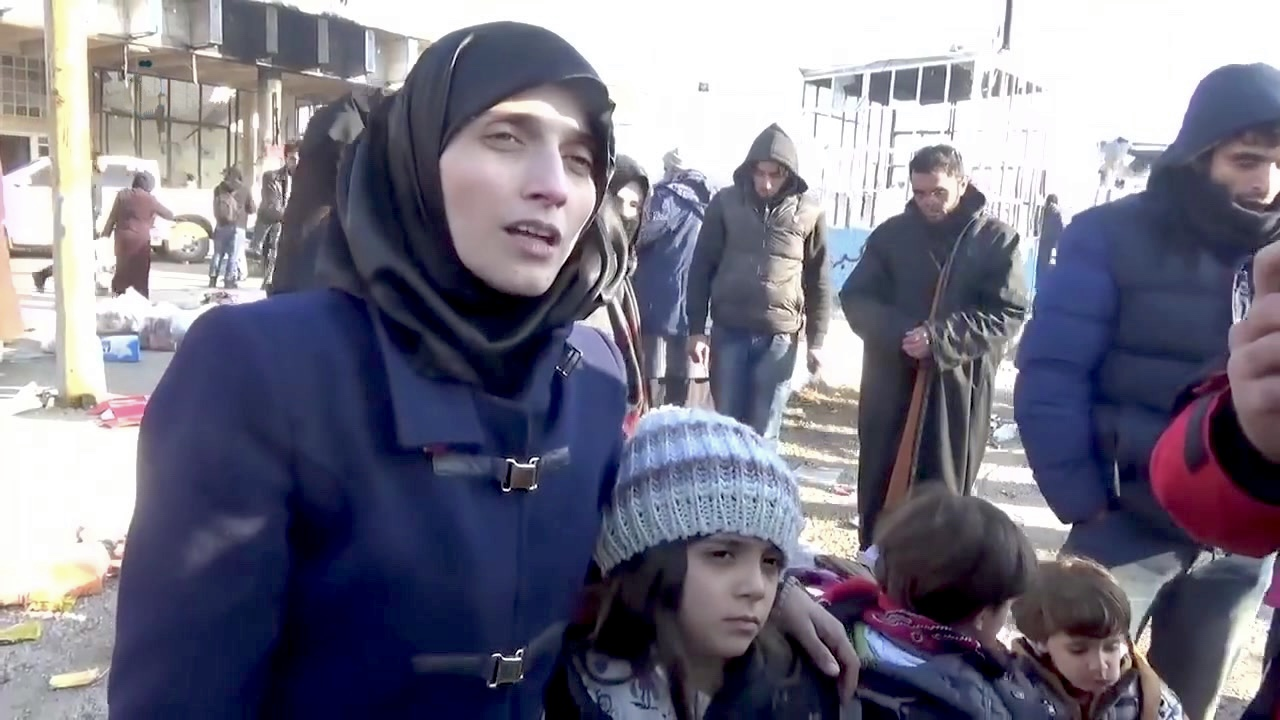
Al-Abed with her mother in 2016

Bana al-Abed's mother, Fatemah, was an English teacher before the war. Her father Ghassan is a lawyer who worked for the ruling local council in southeastern Aleppo. He was injured on 21 December 2016. She has two younger brothers, Noor and Mohamed. Bana also reportedly wanted to be a teacher, but stopped going to school because of the war which destroyed it.

Al-Abed received an ebook copy of Harry Potter from J. K. Rowling in November 2016 after the account tweeted that she could not obtain a physical copy locally. Her family's house was destroyed during a bombing later that month, but she and her family said that they survived with minor injuries.

After the success of the Aleppo offensive by government forces, Turkey and Russia agreed on a ceasefire and evacuation of rebels and civilians from Aleppo. When the evacuations did not go as planned, her mother mentioned Turkish Foreign Minister Mevlüt Çavuşoğlu for making the ceasefire work, and the Foreign Minister said that they were doing all they could to get her and others out. On 19 December 2016, it was reported that al-Abed was among the 350 people who were evacuated from the former rebel-held districts of Aleppo on that day after its capture by government forces.

After evacuating Aleppo, al-Abed was interviewed by Hadi al-Abdullah, where she clarifies that her father was injured in the Sukari district when their house was bombed. On 21 December, she and her family were officially allowed to live in Turkey, and met President Recep Tayyip Erdoğan in front of international press.

On 7 April 2017, the Twitter account tweeted in support of the Shayrat missile strike ordered by U.S. President Donald Trump as a reaction to the Khan Shaykhun chemical weapons attack three days before.

On 12 May 2017, al-Abed and her family were granted Turkish citizenship by Turkish President Recep Tayyip Erdoğan. In October, she visited New York; at the Headquarters of the United Nations she appeared in a recorded Twitter message.

Simon and Schuster published her memoir, entitled Dear World, in 2018. She was also honoured with the Rising Star Award at The Asian Awards.

Following the fall of the Assad regime in December 2024, al-Abed tweeted a video in which she proclaimed the "sun of freedom is finally shining on our land. For the first time, after years of killing, oppression, and deprivation, Syrians are finally living the promise of a dignified life free of fear, free of bombing, and free of the daily threat of displacement." In 2026, she received the International Children's Peace Prize for 2025.

== Criticism ==
Her account has been subject to criticism from vocal opponents, including the setting up of accounts to publicly criticize the account in question. The Twitter account drew particular criticism from voices sympathetic to the Syrian government and its Russian backers, who assailed Bana and her mother as an American propaganda tool to malign the Syrian and Russian governments.

A journalist for The New Yorker observed that her "video statements often have a scripted quality, as if she is being coached by her mother to communicate her thoughts in a language that she is only beginning to learn."

In a now deleted tweet, the account tweeted it is "better to start 3rd world war instead of letting Russia & Assad commit #HolocaustAleppo".
