= Bureij, Homs =

Bureij البريج al-Burayj
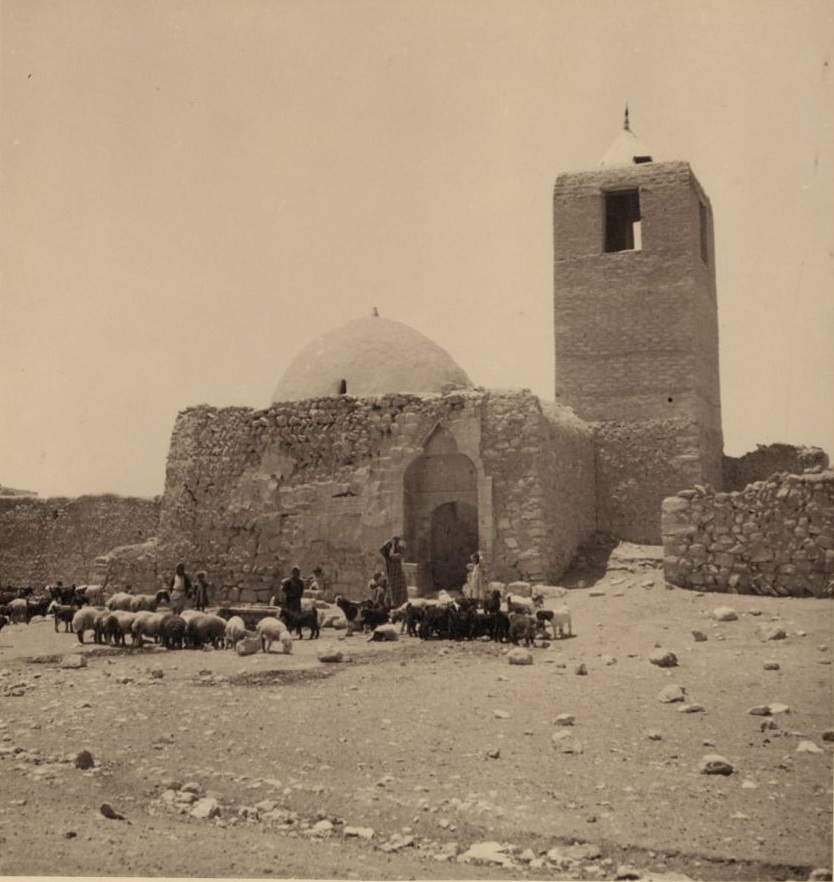
- Bureij in 1936

- Location in Syria
- Coordinates: 34°15′30″N 36°46′16″E
- Country: Syria
- Governorate: Homs
- District: Homs
- Subdistrict: Hisyah

Population (2004)
  - Total: 2,246
- Time zone: UTC+3 (AST)

Bureij (Arabic: البريج, also spelled Burayj) is a village in central Syria, administratively part of the Homs Governorate, south of Homs. Nearby localities include Hisyah to the north, Sadad to the northeast and Qarah to the south. According to the Central Bureau of Statistics (CBS), Bureij had a population of 2,246 in the 2004 census. Its inhabitants are predominantly Sunni Muslims.

In the 19th century, during Ottoman Empire rule, Bureij was a small fortified village with a khan ("caravansary"). While its residents were relatively protected from Bedouin raids because of the village's high walls, their livestock was often plundered. The name "Bureij" is the Arabic term for "little tower."

== Bibliography ==
- Baedeker, Karl (1876). Palestine and Syria, Handbook for Travellers. Vol. 1. Karl Baedeker.
- Porter, J.L. (1858). A Handbook for Travellers in Syria and Palestine. Vol. 1. Murray.
- Robinson, E.; Smith, E. (1841). Biblical Researches in Palestine, Mount Sinai and Arabia Petraea: A Journal of Travels in the year 1838. Vol. 3. Boston: Crocker & Brewster.
