= Fleitz =

Fleitz is a surname. Notable people with the surname include:

- Beverly Baker Fleitz (1930–2014), American tennis player
- Frederick H. Fleitz (born 1962), American intelligence official

== See also ==
- Fleita
