= 2nd Corps (Syria) =

- الفيلق الثاني
- Syrian Armed Forces Flag
- Active: 1985 – 2024
- Country: Ba'athist Syria (surrendered)
- Allegiance: Syrian Armed Forces (surrendered)
- Branch: Syrian Arab Army (surrendered)
- Type: Corps
- Size: up to 35,000 soldiers
- Garrison/HQ: Zabadani; Al-Kiswah (1st Division); Latakia (2nd Division); Qatana (10th Division); Damascus (14th Division)
- Engagements: Lebanese Civil War; Syrian Civil War

Commanders
- Current Commander: Dissolved
- Ceremonial chief: Dissolved
- Notable commanders: Maj. Gen. Talal Makhlouf

The 2nd Corps (Arabic: الفيلق الثاني) was a corps of the Syrian Army that was first formed in 1985. Richard Bennett wrote in 2001 that "three corps [were] formed in 1985 to give the Army more flexibility and to improve combat efficiency by decentralising the command structure, absorbing at least some of the lessons learned during the 1982 Lebanon War." He said that the 2nd Corps with HQ in Zabadani, covered north of Damascus, whole Homs and included Lebanon. In November 2019, Major General Abdul Majeed Ibrahim was appointed as commander of the 2nd Army Corps of the Syrian Arab Army.

== Structure in 2001 ==
- 1st Armored Division, with the 44th and 46th Armored Brigades and the 42nd Mechanized Brigade
- 3rd Armored Division, with the 47th and 82nd Armored Brigades and the 132nd Mechanized Brigade
- 11th Armored Division, with the 60th and 67th Armored Brigades and the 87th Mechanized Brigade
- 4th Mechanized Division with the 1st Armored Brigade and the 61st and 89th Mechanized Brigades
- 10th Mechanized Division, headquartered in Shtoura, Lebanon. Its main units [were in 2001] deployed to control the strategic Beirut-Damascus highway with the 123rd Mechanized Brigade near Yanta, the 51st Armored Brigade near Zahle in the Beqaa Valley and the 85th Armored Brigade, deployed around the complex of positions at Dahr al-Baidar.
- three other heavy brigades from the 3rd and 11th Armored Divisions [were] known to be regularly deployed to eastern Lebanon.
- there [were] five special forces regiments in the Lebanon.

== Structure in 2013 ==
- 1st Armored Division
  - 76th, 91st and 153rd Armored Brigades
  - 58th Mechanized Brigade
  - 141st Artillery Regiment
- 10th Mechanized Division
  - 18th, 62nd and 85th Mechanized Brigades
  - 56th Armored Brigade
- 14th Special Forces Division
  - 36th, 554th and 556th Special Forces Regiments

== Structure in 2019 ==
- 1st Armored Division
  - 61st, 91st and 153rd Armored Brigades
  - 57th, 58th and 68th Mechanized Brigades
  - 171st Infantry Brigade
  - 165th Artillery Brigade
  - 141st Artillery Regiment
  - 167th Anti-tank Regiment
- 2nd Armored Division (formed in 2015)
  - 144th and 145th Armored Brigades
  - 73rd Infantry Brigade
  - 48th and 53rd Special Forces Regiments
  - 826th Coastal Regiment
- 10th Mechanized Division
  - 18th and 62nd Mechanized Brigades
  - 51st and 58th Armored Brigades
  - 122nd Artillery Regiment
- 14th Special Forces Division
  - 36th, 554th and 556th Special Forces Regiments

== Notes ==
- Cooper, Tom (2015). Syrian Conflagration: The Civil War 2011–2013. Middle East@War Volume 1. Helion & Co. ISBN 978-1-910294-10-9.
