= Jandar, Syria =

Jandar جندر Jendar
- Village
- Location in Syria
- Coordinates: 34°29′36″N 36°46′43″E
- Country: Syria
- Governorate: Homs Governorate
- District: Homs District
- Nahiya: Hisyah

Population (2004)
  - Total: 3,423
- Time zone: UTC+3 (AST)

Jandar (Arabic: جندر, also spelled Jendar) is a village in central Syria, administratively part of the Homs Governorate, located 30 kilometers south of Homs. Nearby localities include al-Qusayr to the west, Shamsin to the north, Dardaghan to the east and Hisyah to the south. According to the Syria Central Bureau of Statistics (CBS), Jandar had a population of 3,423 in the 2004 census.

In 2008, Syria's first sugar refinery was built in Jandar. The refinery was a $100 million joint project between Syrian businessman Najib Assaf, government-owned SugarInvest, multinational Cargill, Brazilian company Crystalsev and the Dubai-based Wellington Group. A natural gas power plant is located in Jandar. The Jandar Resort, the largest resort in the country is also located outside the village on the opposite side of the main highway between Homs and Damascus.

== Bibliography ==
- Oxford Business Group (2007). The Report, Emerging Syria 2008. Oxford Business Group. ISBN 9781902339917.
- DIANE Publishing Company (1995). Country Analysis Briefs: 1994: Profiles of Major World Energy Producers, Consumers, and Transport Centers. DIANE Publishing. ISBN 0788125001.
