= Mohammad Yazbek =

Lebanese cleric and Hezbollah member (born 1950)

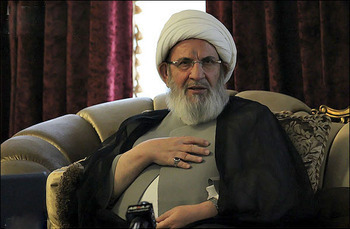
- An image of Mohammad Yazbek in an interview with AhlulBayt News Agency in 2014
- Born: 1950 (age 75–76); Bodai, Baalbek District, Lebanon
- Occupation: Cleric
- Years active: 1980s–present

Mohammad Yazbek (Arabic: محمد يزبك; born 1950) is a Lebanese cleric. He is one of the Hezbollah founders and the head of the Sharia or religious council of the organization.

== Early life and education ==
Yazbek hails from a family based in Bodai, a town near Baalbek in northern Lebanon. He was born there in 1950. He studied theology in Najaf, Iraq, as a pupil of Mohammad Baqr Al Sadr.

== Career ==
After completing his studies in Iraq, Yazbek returned to Lebanon in 1980. He actively contributed to the establishment of khawzas, Shiite religious institutions, in Lebanon. He was a member of Amal movement before his involvement in the foundation of Hezbollah.

Abbas Musawi, Subhi Tufayli and Yazbek, all from the Bekaa valley, founded Hezbollah in 1982. Yazbek supported the revolt of Tufayli in 1987 against the power inequality in Hezbollah in favor of those, who hail from southern Lebanon. Then Yazbek became a senior Hezbollah leader in the Bekaa valley in the 1990s. He issues fatwas in regard to the activities of Hezbollah one of which was in 2006 concerning the production of the exact copies of Captagon by the group. Through this fatwa its production and sale were allowed, but the fatwa also required that it should not be consumed by any Hezbollah member.

Yazbek is the representative of supreme leader of Iran, Mojtaba Khamenei, in the Bekaa valley. He is responsible for distributing the financial grants allocated by Khamenei's office to Hezbollah. In addition, Yazbek is the special representative of Hezbollah's secretary general Hassan Nasrallah and a member of Hezbollah's supreme council, exclusive shura council. In 2009, Yazbek was again elected to the shura council. He also heads the Sharia council of Hezbollah, which is also known as higher legal committee.

=== Views ===
Yazbek praised the bombing of the barracks of the marine peacekeepers in Beirut on 23 October 1983 which killed 241 U.S. military members reporting that it shook America’s throne and France’s might. He also added "Let America and Israel know that we have a lust for martyrdom and that our motto is being turned into reality." He employs an analogy between the Battle of the Camel, first civil war among Muslims, and Hezbollah's use of arms in an attempt to make the armed attacks of Hezbollah legitimate. In 2012, he led to tensions when he revived a historical controversy between Sunnis and Shiites publicly criticising Aisha who was the third spouse of Muhammad.

== Assassination attempt and sanctions ==
On 9 December 2005, Yazbek escaped an assassination attempt unhurt in Baalbek. The bomb blast outside his home caused no casualties.

In May 2017, Yazbek was subject to the sanctions imposed by the U.S. and some of Arab countries, including Saudi Arabia, the United Arab Emirates and Bahrain in addition to other nine senior Hezbollah figures.
