= Al-Nizariyah =

al-Nizariyya النزارية
- Village
- Location in Syria
- Coordinates: 34°25′55″N 36°32′37″E
- Country: Syria
- Governorate: Homs Governorate
- District: al-Qusayr District
- Nahiyah: Al-Qusayr

Population (2004)
  - Total: 3,813
- Time zone: UTC+3 (EET)
  - Summer (DST): UTC+2 (EEST)

Al-Nizariyya Arabic: النزارية, romanized: al-Nīzārīyya) is a village in central Syria, administratively part of the Homs Governorate, located southwest of Homs. It is situated off the Orontes River and at the northeastern border of Lebanon. Nearby localities include Zita al-Gharbiyah to the northwest, Rableh and al-Qusayr to the north and Hisyah further to the east. According to the Central Bureau of Statistics (CBS), Nazariya had a population of 3,813 in the 2004 census.

On 19 October 2011, during the Syrian uprising against the government of Bashar al-Assad, opposition activists claimed two people were killed by security forces in Nazariya. On 26 March 2012, human rights group Avaaz stated one of its activists, Jassim Khaled Diab, was detained by Syrian authorities.
