= Hadi al-Abdullah =

Syrian citizen journalist and activist

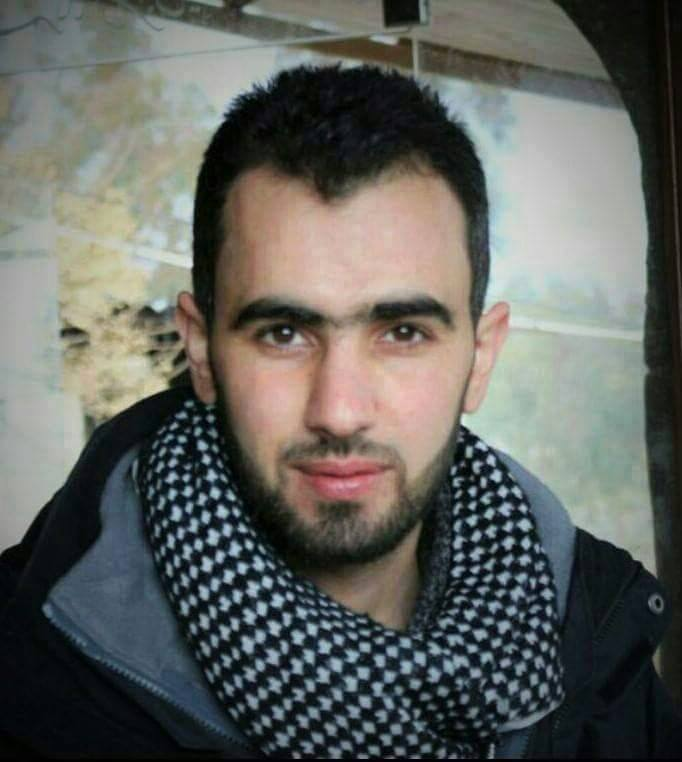
- Hadi al-Abdullah
- Born: May 8, 1987 (age 38); Al-Qusayr, Homs, Syria
- Occupations: Journalist, activist
- Years active: 2011–present
- Website: Hadi Al Abdullah

Hadi al-Abdullah (Arabic: هادي العبدالله; born 8 May 1987) is a Syrian citizen journalist and activist who has risen to prominence through his coverage of the Syrian civil war.

== Personal life ==
Al-Abdullah grew up in Al-Qusayr, Homs to a lower-middle-class family. He holds a bachelor's degree in nursing from Latakia University. When the Syrian revolution started, he was working on his master's degree in Emergency Room Nursing, and thus he left his studies to join other activists in their civil activities.

== Career ==
During his masters preparation, al-Abdullah was studying at Tishreen University. However, in 2011, he left the university and started working first in the distribution of humanitarian aid materials to people, as well as nursing the wounded in field hospitals. Later on, however, he moved to media activism, and due to the pressure it imposed and time it demanded, he had to keep his focus on media and leave all other activities. Currently, al-Abdullah is based in the Idlib Governorate in Syria and is a regular correspondent of television stations and a social media reporter.

On September 2, 2012, al-Abdullah reported on the Farouq Brigades explosive Tunnel warfare targeting the Al Qusair National Hospital. On September 8, 2012, he published a video explaining how to distinguish between adulterated filling and proper stuffing on a Rocket-propelled grenade.

On May 20, 2013, al-Abdullah published front-line footage of rebels responding to Hezbollah during the Battle of al-Qusayr (2013).

In November 2013, al-Abdullah got injured during coverage of battles in Damascus countryside.

In March 2015, al-Abdullah covered for Al Jazeera the celebration of International Women's Day in the Idlib Governorate.

On August 10, 2015, al-Abdullah and Bilal Abdul Kareem published front-line footage of the Army of Conquest blowing up a tunnel in the town of Al-Fu'ah during the Siege of al-Fu'ah and Kafriya.

On November 22, 2015, he covered the release of six Syrian nuns from a rebel prison in an exchange for the bodies of soldiers of the regime's army.

In December 2015, he was invited along with few other journalists to interview Ahmed al-Sharaa, the leader of al-Nusra Front, in a very rare interview.

In January 2016, al-Abdullah and his colleague journalist and activist Raed Fares, were arrested by Jabhat al-Nusra, an al-Qaeda affiliate after a raid on their opposition radio station. Both were later released after spending several hours in the Al-Nusra's custody, the release deal included that al-Abdullah confess that Al Fares's Facebook post was a violation of Sharia, while Jabhat al-Nusra acknowledged that the raid was wrong and agreed to return all equipment, with compensation for any damage.

On March 4, 2016, al-Abdullah was one of the speakers at a 13th Division (Syrian rebel group) demonstration in Maarrat al-Nu'man.

On June 14, 2016, al-Abdullah was injured by a Russian bombing in Aleppo.

On June 17, 2016, al-Abdullah and his cameraman Khaled Al-Issa were critically injured by a blast from an improvised explosive device in an assassination attempt at their apartment in Aleppo. al-Abdullah suffered fractures to his left leg, jaw and eye, while Khaled Al-Issa was in a coma after injures to his abdomen and head. They were moved to a hospital in Turkey for treatment. Al-Issa succumbed to his injuries on June 24, 2016.

On November 7, 2016, in the Reporters Without Borders/TV5 Monde Press Freedom Prize, al-Abdullah was awarded the prize in the journalist category.

On December 19, 2016, al-Abdullah interviewed Bana al-Abed after evacuating Aleppo.

On January 12, 2017, he interviewed Ahrar al-Sham Commander-in-Chief Ali Abu Ammar al-Omar.

On January 11, 2018, al-Abdullah reported on the Sham Legion launching a counter-attack in the countryside of Idlib and Hama.

On February 3, 2018, al-Abdullah reported from the wreckage of a Russian Su-25 shot down by Tahrir al-Sham fighters with a MANPAD.

== Awards and nominations ==
2016 Reporters Without Borders Press Freedom Prize – Won
