= Liftaya =

Liftaya لفتايا
- Village
- Location in Syria
- Coordinates: 34°39′23″N 36°27′45″E
- Country: Syria
- Governorate: Homs Governorate
- District: Homs District
- Nahiyah: Khirbet Tin Nur

Population (2004 census)
  - Total: 2,047
- Time zone: UTC+3 (AST)

Liftaya (Arabic: لفتايا, also spelled Laftaya) is a village in central Syria, administratively part of the Homs Governorate, located southwest of Homs near Lake Homs. Nearby localities include Wujuh al-Hajar to the southeast, Khirbet Ghazi, Khirbet al-Sawda and Khirbet Tin Nur to the northeast. According to the Central Bureau of Statistics (CBS), Liftaya had a population of 2,047 in the 2004 census.
