= Fleitas =

Fleitas is a surname. Notable people with the surname include:

- Ana Fleitas (born 1992), Paraguayan footballer
- Andrés Fleitas (1916–2011), Cuban baseball player
- Ángel Fleitas (1914–2006), Cuban baseball player
- Epifanio Méndez Fleitas (1917–1985), Paraguayan musician, writer, and poet, and central bank president
- José Fleitas (born 1986), Paraguayan footballer
- Leandro Fleitas (born 1983), Argentine footballer
- Manuel Fleitas Solich (1900–1984), Paraguayan football player and coach
- Marcelo Fleitas (born 1973), Uruguayan-Ecuadorian football coach and former player
- Mariana Fleitas (born 1981), Uruguayan handball player
- Miguel Fleitas (born 1956), Cuban-American visual artist, photographer, and film director
- Omar Fleitas Castellano (born 1991), Spanish footballer
- Roberto Fleitas (born 1932), Uruguayan football head coach and former player
- Sebastián Fleitas (1947–2000), Paraguayan football player
