= Rablah =

Rablah ربلة
- Village
- Location in Syria
- Coordinates: 34°27′7″N 36°33′24″E
- Country: Syria
- Governorate: Homs
- District: Al-Qusayr
- Subdistrict: Al-Qusayr

Population (2004)
  - Total: 5,328
- Time zone: UTC+3 (EET)
  - Summer (DST): UTC+2 (EEST)

Rablah (Arabic: ربلة; also spelled Rableh, Ribla or Ribleh) is a town in central Syria, administratively part of the Homs Governorate, located southwest of Homs. Just east of the border with Lebanon, nearby localities include al-Nizariyah to the southwest, Zita al-Gharbiyah to the northwest, al-Qusayr to the north, Zira'ah to the northeast and Hisyah to the east. According to the Central Bureau of Statistics (CBS), Rableh had a population of 5,328 in the 2004 census. Its inhabitants are predominantly Greek Catholics.

== History ==
It is considered to be the site of the ancient town of Riblah (Numbers 34:11 ), whose tell is covered by a cemetery not far from the modern town. In Roman times, the town also bore the name Daphne.

During the 2025 massacres of Syrian Alawites and Western Syria clashes, on November 9, 2025 two gunmen atop a motorcycle opened direct fire on Hussein Issa Alloush al-Youssef, a 50-year-old member of the Alawite community, and Fadi Riyad al-Atram, a 35-year-old Syrian Christian, in the town of Rabla. The armed attack left both men critically injured, dying at nearby hospitals after succumbing to their severe wounds.

== Bibliography ==
- Smith, Eli; Robinson, Edward (1841). Biblical Researches in Palestine, Mount Sinai and Arabia Petraea: A Journal of Travels in the Year 1838. Vol. 3. Crocker and Brewster.
