= First Battle of al-Qusayr =

Battle during the Syrian civil war

Coordinates: 34.5119°N 36.5764°E

- Part of the Syrian War early insurgency phase and Hezbollah involvement in the Syrian civil war
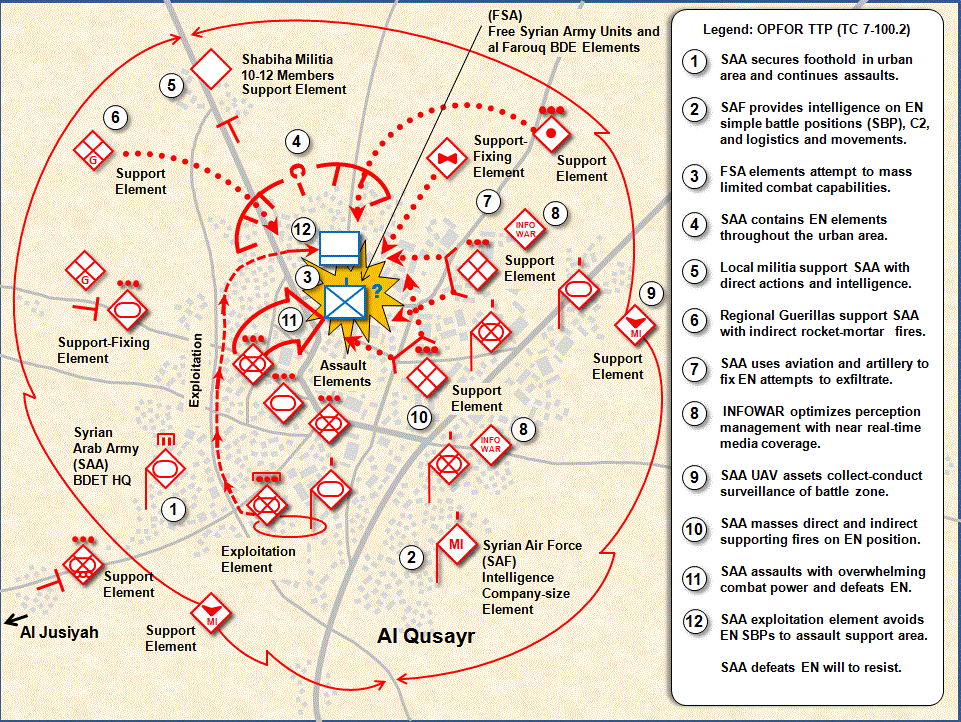
Date	10 February – 20 April 2012 (2 months, 1 week and 3 days)
Location	Al-Qusayr, Homs Governorate, Syria
Result	Stalemate: Opposition forces control the northern half of the city; Government forces control the southern half of the city; The Syrian Army, supported by Hezbollah launches a counter-offensive in April 2013

Belligerents
Free Syrian Army; Fatah al-Islam	(Syria) Syrian Arab Republic; Hezbollah

Commanders and leaders
Abu Arab; Mustafa Bakr; Abdel Ghani Jawhar †	(Ba'athist Syria) Unknown

Units involved
(Syrian opposition) Free Syrian Army; Farouq Brigades; Wadi Brigades; 77th Brigade	Syrian Army; 1st Armoured Division; Security agencies

Strength
Unknown overall: 120 FSA Farouq Brigade fighters; Unknown FSA 77th Brigade fighters; 30 Fatah al-Islam fighters; 1 tank	400 Army soldiers and militia 15 tanks

The First Battle of al-Qusayr was fought by the Syrian army and Shabiha against the Free Syrian Army in the small city of Al-Qusayr, near Homs, during late winter and spring of 2012.

== Background ==
From November 2011, Al-Qusayr was controlled by opposition forces and besieged by units of the Syrian Army. At least 66 residents of the city were believed by Western media outlets to have been killed by the security forces before heavier fighting began in February 2012.

The importance of the town was magnified by its location next to Lebanon and its position straddling a weapons smuggling route. Control of the town also allowed for the control of the border with Lebanon and the Lebanese village of al-Qasr. Additionally, al-Qusayr is close to both the Damascus-Homs and Homs-Tartus highways. From the government's perspective, maintaining control of al-Qusayr would have placed significant pressure upon the opposition's then-stronghold of Homs by cutting a key supply route between opposition fighters and inflows of weapons and resources from Lebanon; from the opposition's perspective it would have helped sever lines of communications between the capital and the government's traditional area of support in the coastal regions, particularly amongst the Alawite minority.

== 2012 Battle ==
=== Major fighting ===
On 10 February, Syrian state media reported the resumption of fighting in Al-Qusayr and the death of a lieutenant colonel, a chief warrant officer, and two other policemen. Three days later fighting between the Free Syrian Army and the Syrian army intensified, when the FSA's men took control of the Syrian intelligence services building in the city, killing 5 military intelligence members in the attack. After the attack on the intelligence building, members of the FSA prepared for a battle as the estimated 400 pro-government soldiers and militia in the city barricaded themselves in the main hospital and the town hall. The FSA then received reports that four tanks were approaching from the north. At the time, there were said to be still 20 government snipers in the city, "firing on anything that moves". Residents, activists and other sources said that snipers had been the primary cause of the deaths of over 70 residents of the city since November. On 21 February, artillery reportedly bombarded the city and killed 5 civilians.

On 15 February, three farmers that had been detained at an army checkpoint were later found dead in Al-Qusayr.

=== FSA advance ===
A reporter from the times, who entered the town but left before 25 February, reported heavy fighting, including FSA fighters capturing a main government checkpoint in the north of the town, and four pro-government militia, shabiba, being killed, possibly executed.

The FSA was eventually able to "turn the tide" on 25 February, when 30 soldiers and a T-62 tank defected to the Free Syrian Army's side. The tank proved invaluable to the fighters. It was hidden temporarily and then jump-started with the aid of two tractors and a truck and proved its worth immediately by firing shells into the enemy positions and turning the battle. The FSA was then able to capture most major government strongholds in the city. A photo was also posted later in the day, appearing to show the tank that had been used by opposition forces, with FSA fighters around it. A technical also appeared in the photo.

After the battle, the local fighters in the city told journalists that 20 soldiers had died in the fighting, and a further 80 soldiers still loyal to the government had fled the city. The pro-government forces reportedly lost three tanks in total to the FSA. FSA commanders in the city said that despite the FSA's two-day advance, the government had not been able to send reinforcements to the city, prompting the remaining government forces to flee the city. The local fighters said that one of them had been killed and six had been wounded in the fighting.

On 27 February, shells fired by the Syrian Army hit the city, followed by sustained gunfires, but no casualties were reported. A doctor told that the army has been deployed into the state hospital since 5 months. The city of Qusayr which is 15 kilometres (9.3 mi) away from Homs has become more isolated when the soldiers destroyed a secret tunnel which linked the two cities. Rebel soldiers reported that 35 army tanks were stationed near the city while 200 tanks were in Homs. The same day, an AFP journalist reported seeing an army drone collecting intelligence information above the city.

On 29 February, the FSA and Syrian army both partially controlled different sections of the town. The Syrian army specifically controlled the town's hospital, town hall and cemetery. Due to lack of access to the cemetery 60 people were buried in a public garden, including a recently killed photographer, who died from his wounds in Lebanon and was sent back for his burial in his hometown. The rebels, who were holding about half of the city, complained that they were running low on ammunition as it was increasingly difficult to get weapons from Lebanon due to the deployment of the Syrian army. Around 60 percent of the residents of this 15,000 inhabitant city fled the fighting, while two young men who fled the city confirmed that tanks had entered the Baba Amr quarter in Homs

=== Military counter-attack ===
The loss by the FSA of Hom's Baba Amr neighborhood on 1 March, left only a few neighborhoods of resistance in the city of Homs. Al-Qusayr, along with Rastan, was one of the last major rebel-held towns in the province of Homs. On the morning of 4 March, the army launched an offensive on Al-Qusayr, starting with artillery shelling, followed by tanks rolling into town.

One soldier was killed in the city on 17 March. Government artillery brought down a bridge near Al-Qusayr, which was a route for civilian refugees, retreating rebels and wounded leaving Homs province and going to Lebanon.

The town was reported under rebel control on 20 March, however, tanks were shelling the town from the outside, and government snipers were still firing on residents. One FSA fighter reported that the Syrian army might launch a new offensive to try and take the town, and that at least two civilians were killed in one round of shelling. The entire town was reported under nonstop shelling from government forces, according to an al Jazeera video report from inside al-Qusayr. The shelling was said to have been going on for months, nearly all the buildings were said to have been damaged or affected by the shelling of government forces. In the report, two dead civilians were shown, who were killed in a series of rocket barrages. Four more bodies of dead civilians were shown at the end of the report. Three civilians were reported killed by shelling of mortar fire on the town.

Opposition sources claimed that the Syrian army was targeting residents of the town on 22 March. The military was reportedly using mortars and snipers. In a new round of fighting, three civilians were reportedly killed and four soldiers died when FSA fighters attacked their checkpoint. On 5 April, four opposition fighters, three civilians and one soldier died in heavy fighting in the town.

On 19 April, the rebels claimed to have destroyed a pair of Syrian tanks and an armored personnel carrier, as well as killing more than a dozen Syrian soldiers in the two days of fighting. The driver of a Syrian tank also defected during the battle, according to the rebels. It was reported on 20 April that the Syrian Army controlled half of the city and the rebels the other half. One civilian was also killed by Army mortar fire, according to the town hospital.

== Aftermath ==
=== Stalemate ===
By 23 April, the FSA had taken over security responsibilities in northern Qusayr and surrounding villages and brought at least one former police officer back to work. A commander said that the group’s main focus was on continuing attacks against the Syrian military and protecting civilians from the government's attacks. It was also reported that one of the leaders of the radical Lebanese terrorist group Fatah al-Islam, Abdel Ghani Jawhar, was killed in Qusayr, after he blew himself up while making a bomb on 20 April. According to the group, he had traveled to Syria with a group of 30 Lebanese fighters to participate in the uprising. A week later on 29 April an army officer was killed in the Al-Qusayr area.

On 9 May, Al Jazeera reporter James Bays ventured to Qusayr and found that there were two main brigades of opposition fighters in the city. The 77th Brigade was a unit made up almost entirely of former government soldiers. In the town, they were under the command of a captain who used to head an elite commando unit in the national army. They were well trained, according to Bays. The other brigade was the Farouq Brigades which had many civilian volunteers but was mostly made up of army defectors. The brigades were under the same overall commander, a colonel in the town. He said that "tanks are always repositioning. About a week ago, more than 15 tanks have violated the ceasefire in an attempt by the regime to cut off the city and divided into sectors." In the following weeks, three civilians were killed on 29 May after the army shelled Al-Qusayr.

=== FSA offensive ===
The FSA launched attacks on checkpoints across the city on 15 June. The next day, fighting continued between the rebels and the Army. State media reported that the military destroyed two rebel pickup trucks, killing a number of fighters. The following day, it was reported that six rebels trying to infiltrate Qusayr from Lebanon were killed, and four others were injured. The FSA claimed the same day that they had driven the government forces out of their stronghold in the southern part of the city, and they sent footage to the Al Jazeera television network that showed them in possession of a captured government tank and anti-aircraft weaponry. However, the capture of the southern part of Al-Qusayr could not be independently confirmed.

In early July, it was confirmed that the fighting for the city was still ongoing when an Al Jazeera correspondent made an exclusive report which witnessed the capture of the main government stronghold in Qusayr, the town hall. It was demolished by the rebels so it couldn't be retaken. Dozens of rebels were killed while they were trying to infiltrate Syria from Lebanon. A soldier was killed and three were injured as well in this clash.

On 10 July, reports suggested Al-Qusayr was completely under rebel control, with the city being under siege from the surrounding countryside, while residents were facing a humanitarian catastrophe. However, later, it was confirmed that government troops still held the town's main road.

On 29 July, 8 rebels were killed and 15 other wounded when the law enforcement members repelled an attack, state media reported. On 30 July, five rebels were killed in Al Qusayr. On October 2, the FSA claimed to have killed Hezbollah commander Ali Hussein Nassif during an ambush in the vicinity of Al-Qusayr. On October 17, Free Syrian Army rebels said they had captured 13 Hezbollah fighters near Al-Qusayr in the previous week, and threatened to retaliate against Hezbollah strongholds in Beirut. The rebels also claimed that Hezbollah has fired Katyusha and Grad rockets at them, from inside Lebanon. The New York Times reported that rockets were indeed being launched from nearby Hermel, a Hezbollah-dominated town in Lebanon, across the border, about 10 miles from Al-Qusayr.

In trying to control a high point between al-Qusayr and Lebanon, opposition fighters tried to drive out the Shia residents and fought with the Syrian People’s Committees' fighters after the withdrawal of government forces. The SPC fighters were able to hold on to the ground.

== 2013 Government counter-offensive ==
A second government counter-offensive began in mid-May 2013 and ended three weeks later. It resulted in the recapture of the city by government forces, supported by Hezbollah. The battle has been called a turning point in the civil war.
