= Fleita =

Fleita is a surname. Notable people with the surname include:

- Jonatan Fleita (born 1995), Argentine footballer
- Juan Ramón Fleita (born 1972), Argentine footballer

== See also ==
- Fleitas
- Fleitz
