= Dardaghan =

Dardaghan دردغان
- Village
- Location in Syria
- Coordinates: 34°40′26″N 36°52′10″E
- Country: Syria
- Governorate: Homs Governorate
- District: Homs District
- Nahiyah: Al-Riqama

Population (2004)
  - Total: 1,497
- Time zone: UTC+3 (AST)

Dardaghan (Arabic: دردغان, romanized: Dardaghān, also spelled al-Dardaghan) is a village in central Syria, administratively part of the Homs Governorate, located southeast of Homs. Nearby localities include Jandar to the west, Hisyah to the southwest and al-Riqama to the northeast. According to the Central Bureau of Statistics (CBS), Dardaghan had a population of 1,497 in the 2004 census.
