= Al-Qusayr, Daraa Governorate =

Al-Qusayr القصير Ekseir
- Village
- Location within Syria
- Coordinates: 32°44′33″N 35°52′52″E
- Grid position: 232/238 PAL
- Country: Syria
- Governorate: Daraa
- District: Daraa
- Subdistrict: Shajara

Population (2004 census)
  - Total: 674
- Time zone: UTC+3 (AST)

Al-Qusayr (Arabic: القصير, also transliterated Ekseir) is a village in southern Syria, administratively part of the Daraa Governorate, located west of Daraa. According to the Syria Central Bureau of Statistics, al-Qusayr had a population of 674 in the 2004 census.

== Geography ==
The village has an elevation of 350 meters (1,150 ft) above sea level. It is near the deep northern bank of the Yarmuk River valley and overlooks the Yarmuk and the confluence of the Wadi al-Harir and Wadi al-Shilala streams. It was historically supplied by the Ayn al-Qusayr (Ain el-Ekseir) spring to the village's north.

== History ==
=== Ottoman period ===
In 1596 Al-Qusayr appeared under the name of Qasir in the Ottoman tax registers being in the nahiya of Jawlan Garbi in the Hauran Sanjak. It had an entirely Muslim population consisting of 16 households and 10 bachelors. The villagers paid a fixed tax-rate of 25% on agricultural products, such as wheat (2,700 akçe), barley (450 a.), summer crops (550 a.), goats and beehives (200 a.); in addition to "occasional revenues" (100 a.) and tax on a water mill (30 a.); a total of 4,000 akçe.

In 1884 Gottlieb Schumacher noted al-Qusayr (which he spelled 'Ekseir') was a village of 100 inhabitants living in thirty-five stone and clay huts (some of which were deserted). Although it had fertile lands, the population was in decline, a situation Schumacher attributed to the village's poor water quality.

== Bibliography ==
- Hütteroth, W.-D.; Abdulfattah, K. (1977). Historical Geography of Palestine, Transjordan and Southern Syria in the Late 16th Century. Erlanger Geographische Arbeiten, Sonderband 5. Erlangen, Germany: Vorstand der Fränkischen Geographischen Gesellschaft. ISBN 3-920405-41-2.
- Schumacher, G. (1886). Across the Jordan: Being an Exploration and Survey of part of Hauran and Jaulan. London: Richard Bentley and Son.
