= Al-Daminah =

Al-Daminah الدمينة
- Village
- Location in Syria
- Coordinates: 34°58′57″N 36°53′38″E
- Country: Syria
- Governorate: Hama
- District: Hama
- Subdistrict: Hama

Population (2004)
  - Total: 752
- Time zone: UTC+3 (AST)
- City Qrya Pcode: C2994

Al-Daminah (Arabic: الدمينة) is a Syrian village located in the Hama Subdistrict of the Hama District in the Hama Governorate. According to the Syria Central Bureau of Statistics (CBS), al-Daminah had a population of 752 in the 2004 census.

Many of its residents have been displaced by the Syrian Civil War and the village has been partially destroyed.
