= José Fleitas =

Paraguayan footballer (born 1986)

Personal information
- Full name: José Eliseo Fleitas Villalba
- Date of birth: 7 November 1986 (age 40)
- Place of birth: Bella Vista Norte, Paraguay
- Position: Defender

Youth career
- Olimpia

Senior career*
| Years | Team | Apps | (Gls) |
| 2007–2009 | Cruz del Sur | 29 | (3) |
| 2010–2012 | Deportivo Roca | 49 | (2) |
| 2012 | Textil Mandiyú | – | (–) |
| 2013 | Naval | 4 | (0) |
| 2014 | Guaireña | – | (–) |
| 2015–2016 | Racing de Trelew | 23 | (1) |
| 2017 | Atlántico | – | (–) |
| 2018–2019 | Aurora | 48 | (1) |
| 2021 | Atlético Vega Real | – | (–) |
- * Club domestic league appearances and goals

José Eliseo Fleitas Villalba (born 7 November 1986) is a Paraguayan former footballer.

== Teams ==
- (Paraguay) Olimpia (youth)
- (Argentina) Cruz del Sur 2007–2009
- (Argentina) Deportivo Roca 2010–2012
- (Chile) Naval 2013
- (Argentina) Textil Mandiyú 2012
- (Paraguay) Guaireña 2014
- (Argentina) Racing de Trelew 2015–2016
- (Dominican Republic) Atlántico 2017
- (Bolivia) Aurora 2018–2019
- (Dominican Republic) Atlético Vega Real 2021
