= Wujuh al-Hajar =

Wujuh al-Hajar وجه الحجر Woojeh al-Hajjar
- Location in Syria
- Coordinates: 34°38′36″N 36°28′59″E
- Country: Syria
- Governorate: Homs Governorate
- District: Homs District
- Nahiyah: Khirbet Tin Nur

Population (2004)
  - Total: 831
- Time zone: UTC+3 (EET)
  - Summer (DST): UTC+2 (EEST)

Wujuh al-Hajar (Arabic: وجه الحجر, also spelled Woojeh al-Hajjar) is a village in western Syria, administratively part of the Homs Governorate, southwest of Homs. It is situated near the border with Lebanon to the south, and nearby localities include Khirbet al-Ghazi to the northeast and Laftaya to the northwest. According to the Central Bureau of Statistics (CBS), Wujuh al-Hajar had a population of 831 in the 2004 census.
