= Al-Buwaydah al-Sharqiyah =

al-Buwaidah al_Sharqiyah البويضة الشرقية al-Buwaideh al-Sharqiyeh
- Village
- Location in Syria
- Coordinates: 34°36′16″N 36°38′45″E
- Country: Syria
- Governorate: Homs
- District: Al-Qusayr
- Subdistrict: Al-Qusayr

Population (2004)
  - Total: 3,196
- Time zone: UTC+3 (EET)
  - Summer (DST): UTC+2 (EEST)

Al-Buwaidah al-Sharqiyah (Arabic: البويضة الشرقية, also spelled al-Buwaideh al-Sharqiyeh) is a village in central Syria, administratively part of the Homs Governorate, located southeast of Homs. Nearby localities include al-Qusayr and al-Dabaah to the southwest, Damina al-Sharqiya to the southeast, Shinshar to the east and Qattina to the northwest. According to the Central Bureau of Statistics (CBS), al-Buwaidah al-Sharqiyah had a population of 3,196 in the 2004 census. Its inhabitants are predominantly Sunni Muslims.

In the 19th-century it was reported that most of the village was built from basalt rock.

== Syrian civil war ==
The village was the site of the al-Buwaida al-Sharqiya massacre in May 2012, during the Syrian civil war. Opposition activists claimed 13 factory workers were killed by the government's security forces, while Syrian government sources blamed rebel forces for the killings

On 8 June 2013, the town was recaptured by the Syrian Army during the Al-Qusayr offensive.

== Bibliography ==
- Socin, Albert (1898). Palestine and Syria: Handbook for Travellers. Karl Baedeker.
- Smith, Eli; Robinson, Edward (1841). Biblical Researches in Palestine, Mount Sinai and Arabia Petraea: A Journal of Travels in the Year 1838. Vol. 3. Crocker and Brewster.
