= Khirbet Ghazi =

Khirbet Ghazi خربة غازي
- Location in Syria
- Coordinates: 34°40′23″N 36°31′7″E
- Country: Syria
- Governorate: Homs Governorate
- District: Homs District
- Nahiya: Khirbet Tin Nur

Population (2004)
  - Total: 3,056
- Time zone: UTC+3 (AST)

Khirbet Ghazi (Arabic: خربة غازي) is a village in western Syria, administratively part of the Homs Governorate, southwest of Homs. Nearby localities include Wujuh al-Hajar and Laftaya to the southwest. According to the Central Bureau of Statistics (CBS), Khirbet Ghazi had a population of 3,056 in the 2004 census.
