= Al-Houz =

al-Houz الحوز al-Huz
- Village
- Location in Syria
- Coordinates: 34°34′24″N 36°31′15″E
- Country: Syria
- Governorate: Homs
- District: al-Qusayr
- Subdistrict: al-Houz

Population (2004)
  - Total: 2,239
- Time zone: UTC+3 (EET)
  - Summer (DST): UTC+2 (EEST)

Al-Houz (Arabic: الحوز, also spelled al-Huz) is a village in central Syria, administratively part of the Homs Governorate, located southwest of Homs. Situated at the southern edge of Lake Qattinah, nearby localities include Aqrabiyah to the southwest, Arjoun and al-Qusayr to the southeast, Kafr Mousa to the east and al-Ghassaniya to the northeast. According to the Central Bureau of Statistics (CBS), al-Houz had a population of 2,239 in the 2004 census. It is an Alawite village.
