= Ali Hussein Nassif =

Commander of Hezbollah Forces in Syria

Personal details
- Born: Bodai, Baalbek, Lebanon
- Died: 1 October 2012 Homs, Syria
- Resting place: Bodai, Baalbek, Lebanon
- Party: Hezbollah
- Nickname: Abu Abbas

Military service
- Allegiance: Hezbollah
- Years of service: ? - 2012
- Battles/wars: Syrian civil war: Siege of Homs

Ali Hussein Nassif, known as Abu Abbas, was a Shia Lebanese politician and high-ranking founding member of Hezbollah. Nassif was the designated commander of all Hezbollah fighters in Syria during the Syrian civil war until his death on 1 October 2012 at the hands of the Free Syrian Army.

Reports of his death varied: some sources claimed Nassif had been killed by a roadside bomb or in an ensuing gunfight, while others reported that he was killed in an RPG attack. Nassif's body was returned to Lebanon and his funeral was held in the eastern Lebanese city of Baalbek with senior party members present on 2 October 2012.
