= Hisyah =

Hisyah حِسْيَاء Hasya
- Town
- Location in Syria
- Coordinates: 34°24′39″N 36°45′31″E
- Country: Syria
- Governorate: Homs
- District: Homs
- Subdistrict: Hisyah

Population (2004)
  - Total: 5,435
- Time zone: UTC+3 (AST)

Hisyah (Arabic: حِسْيَاء, romanized: Ḥisyāʾ, also spelled Hasya, Hasiyah, Hesa or Hessia) is a town in central Syria, administratively part of the Homs Governorate, located about 35 kilometers south of Homs. Situated on the M5 Highway between Homs and Damascus, nearby localities include al-Qusayr and Rableh to the northwest, Shamsin and Jandar to the north, Dardaghan to the northeast, Sadad to the southeast and Bureij to the south. According to the Central Bureau of Statistics (CBS), Hisyah had a population of 5,425 in the 2004 census. Its inhabitants are mostly Sunni Muslims and Catholics.

== History ==
=== Ancient period ===
During the Neo-Assyrian period in Syria (9th century BCE – 7th century BCE), Hisyah served as a post station known as "Hesa" on the road to Damascus. During the reign of Tiglath-Pileser III, it initially contained a full cohort of military craftsmen. Due to the small population in the area around Hesa, the cohort was later moved out and replaced by 30 Assyrian households subject to army recruitment. The village was managed by two junior military officials.

=== Ottoman era ===
During Ottoman Empire rule in Syria, particularly in the 18th-century, Hisyah became a fortified garrison town headed by an agha. The garrison served as the dominant military faction in the Homs district and its commanders frequently served as district governors. The town was located on what was known as the "Sultanic Road" which eventually led to Istanbul, the seat of the sultanate. Hisyah's isolated location on the edge of the Syrian Desert made it very vulnerable to Bedouin attacks, but it served a dual purpose as a place where negotiations between the government and the Bedouin tribes were held and where military campaigns against the Bedouin were launched. Hisyah was also utilized for controlling the trade of wheat and barley, where the cereals were collected and stored in mills.

The area was marked by abandoned villages and Hisyah itself was described as being "a miserable place" by Richard Pococke who traveled the region in the 1730s. Pocock further mentioned that the town contained a governor's house, a mosque, a khan ("caravansary") with three houses enclosed within its walls and a few other homes built around it. According to Ottoman history expert Dick Douwes, the inhabitants were most likely the families of the town's governors and the janissaries who manned the fortress. Along with the allied garrison at Ma'arat al-Numan, Hisyah played an important role in the pacification of the region between Damascus and Aleppo. Ma'arra aided Hisyah in its campaigns against the Mawali tribes of northern Syria. In 1717 Hisyah's cavalry relieved the city of Hama from a Bedouin assault. The Arab Isma'il Agha al-Azm was chief of the garrison at that time and also served as the governor of Hama and Homs.

In the mid-19th-century, Western traveler Josias Leslie Porter noted that Hisyah was walled and included a khan. An agha and 150 nominal cavalry troops were stationed there in order to protect regional towns from Bedouin raids, principally launched by clans belonging to the Anizah tribe. A few years prior to Porter's visit, the former agha and 18 of his soldiers were killed in an ambush by the local Walid Ali Bedouin tribe. The village was mostly inhabited by Christians.

=== Modern era ===
The Suweidan family dominated Hisyah during the French Mandate period.

Today, one of the few Syrian road-police stations in the area between Homs and Damascus is located in Hisyah. An industrial city, with a total area of 2,500 hectares was built in the town by the Syrian government in 2001.

== Bibliography ==
- Baedeker, Karl (1876). Palestine and Syria, Handbook for Travellers. Vol. 1. Karl Baedeker.
- Douwes, Dick (2000). The Ottomans in Syria: a history of justice and oppression. I.B. Tauris. ISBN 1860640311.
- Porter, Josias Leslie (1868). A Handbook for Travellers in Syria and Palestine. Vol. 1. Murray.
- Robinson, E.; Smith, E. (1841). Biblical Researches in Palestine, Mount Sinai and Arabia Petraea: A Journal of Travels in the year 1838. Vol. 3. Boston: Crocker & Brewster.
- Weippert, Manfred (2002). No Country By Itself. Saint-Paul. ISBN 3525530439.
