= Shinshar =

Shinshar شنشار Shanshar
- Village
- Location in Syria
- Coordinates: 34°36′0″N 36°44′0″E
- Country: Syria
- Governorate: Homs
- District: Al-Qusayr
- Subdistrict: Al-Qusayr

Population (2017)
  - Total: 2 588
- Time zone: UTC+3 (EET)
  - Summer (DST): UTC+2 (EEST)

Shinshar (Arabic: شنشار, romanized: Shinshār, also spelled Shanshar) is a village in central Syria, administratively part of the Homs Governorate, located between Homs to the north, al-Qusayr to the southwest and Shamsin to the south. According to the Central Bureau of Statistics (CBS), Shinshar had a population of 3,118 in the 2004 census. Its inhabitants are predominantly Sunni Muslims.

== Bibliography ==
- Robinson, E.; Smith, E. (1841). Biblical Researches in Palestine, Mount Sinai and Arabia Petraea: A Journal of Travels in the year 1838. Vol. 3. Boston: Crocker & Brewster.
