= Zita al-Gharbiyah =

Zita al-Gharbiyah زيتا الغربية Zeita
- Village
- Location in Syria
- Coordinates: 34°30′34″N 36°29′06″E
- Country: Syria
- Governorate: Homs
- District: Al-Qusayr
- Subdistrict: Al-Qusayr

Population (2004)
  - Total: 2,922
- Time zone: UTC+3 (EET)
  - Summer (DST): UTC+2 (EEST)

Zita al-Gharbiyah (Arabic: زيتا الغربية, also spelled Zeita) is a village in central Syria, administratively part of the Homs Governorate, located southwest of Homs and immediately north of the border with Lebanon. Nearby localities include Aqrabiyah to the north, Kadesh and Arjoun to the northeast, the district center of al-Qusayr to the east and Jusiyah al-Amar to the southeast. According to the Central Bureau of Statistics (CBS), Zita al-Gharbiyah had a population of 2,922 in the 2004 census. The population is predominantly Shia Muslim and is immediately surrounded by several smaller Shia Muslim villages. Although the village is in Syria, its inhabitants are Lebanese.

History

The place name ends with a long vowel -ā, typically reflecting the Aramaic absolute state, a morphological feature widely attested in Levantine toponyms.

In the mid-19th-century ancient ruins were found in Zita al-Gharbiyah. During a military training drill in the vicinity in 2005, stalactite caves were found in the village that resembled the Jeita Grotto in Lebanon. The cave was studied by a team from the al-Baath University of Homs and by the government Department of Tourism and Antiquities. It was determined that cave dates back 60 million years ago.

During the Syrian civil war, Zita al-Gharbiyah has been the scene of several clashes between the opposition Free Syrian Army (FSA) and local fighters backed by Hezbollah. The village has formed a front with other Shia-majority villages against villages in the vicinity of al-Qusayr that have hosted the FSA. In the summer of 2012, two residents of Zita al-Gharbiyah were kidnapped by the FSA prompting members of the north Lebanon-based Jaafar clan which also inhabits the village to abduct 32 Syrians. Consequently, a reconciliation committee consisting of Shia clans from the Hermel region of Lebanon and pro-FSA villages in the al-Qusayr region was formed, resulting in the return of hostages and a calming of tensions. However, clashes had restarted by early 2013.

== Bibliography ==
- Edwards, B. B. (1848). Bibliotheca Sacra. Vol. 5. Dallas Theological Seminary.
