= Al-Aqrabiyah =

Aqrabiyah العقربية Akrabieh
- Village
- Location in Syria
- Coordinates: 34°32′17″N 36°28′24″E
- Country: Syria
- Governorate: Homs
- District: Al-Qusayr
- Subdistrict: Al-Qusayr

Population (2004)
  - Total: 4,326
- Time zone: UTC+3 (EET)
  - Summer (DST): UTC+2 (EEST)

Aqrabiyah (Arabic: العقربية, also spelled Akrabieh or Aqrabieh; also known as al-Buwaydah al-Gharbiyah) is a village in central Syria, administratively part of the Homs Governorate, located southwest of Homs and immediately east and north of the border with Lebanon. Nearby localities include Zita al-Gharbiyah to the southeast, the district center of al-Qusayr to the east, Arjoun and al-Houz to the northeast and al-Naim to the north.

According to the Central Bureau of Statistics (CBS), Aqrabiyah had a population of 4,326 in the 2004 census. The population is predominantly Shia Muslim and is immediately surrounded by several smaller Shia Muslim villages. Although the village is in Syria, according to the Lebanese newspaper The Daily Star its inhabitants are Lebanese. Another Lebanese newspaper, Al Akhbar, writes that 18% of the village's residents are Lebanese citizens.
