= Arjoun =

Arjoun زفريط عرجون Zakreet Arjon
- Village
- Location in Syria
- Coordinates: 34°33′28″N 36°32′11″E
- Country: Syria
- Governorate: Homs
- District: Al-Qusayr
- Subdistrict: Al-Qusayr

Population (2004)
  - Total: 2,465
- Time zone: UTC+3 (EET)
  - Summer (DST): UTC+2 (EEST)

Arjoun (Arabic: عرجون, romanized: Arjūn, also spelled Arcun or Arjoon), is a village in central Syria, administratively part of the Homs Governorate, located southwest of Homs. Nearby localities include Aqrabiyah to the southwest, al-Qusayr to the southeast, al-Dabaah to the east, Kafr Mousa and al-Ghassaniya to the north and al-Houz to the northwest. According to the Central Bureau of Statistics (CBS), Arjoun had a population of 2,465 in the 2004 census. Its inhabitants are predominantly Sunni Muslims.

19th-century Biblical scholars identified Arjoun as "Argana" where in 854 BCE the Neo-Assyrian king Shalmaneser II fought the army of Hadadezer in the Battle of Qarqar. Other sources insist that Argana was located somewhere north of modern-day Hama. An Ancient Roman milestone was found in the village, suggesting it was situated on a Roman road. In his visit to Syria, James Silk Buckingham described Arjoun in the early 19th century as a small village lying below an artificial mound. At the mound's summit was the tomb of a local sheikh surrounded by a few buildings.

== Bibliography ==
- Buckingham, James Silk (1825). Travels Among the Arab Tribes Inhabiting the Countries East of Syria and Palestine. Longmann.
- Babylonian & oriental record. D. Nutt. 1889.
- Conder, Claude Reignier (1892). Heth and Moab: Explorations in Syria in 1881 and 1882. Macmillan.
- Conder, Claude Reignier (1902). The First Bible. W. Blackwood.
- Smith, Eli; Robinson, Edward (1841). Biblical Researches in Palestine, Mount Sinai and Arabia Petraea: A Journal of Travels in the Year 1838. Vol. 3. Crocker and Brewster.
