= Kafr Mousa =

Kafr Mousa كفر موسى Kafr Musa
- Village
- Location in Syria
- Coordinates: 34°34′42″N 36°32′52″E
- Country: Syria
- Governorate: Homs
- District: Al-Qusayr
- Subdistrict: Al-Qusayr

Population (2004)
  - Total: 1,610
- Time zone: UTC+3 (EET)
  - Summer (DST): UTC+2 (EEST)

Kafr Mousa (Arabic: كفر موسى, also spelled Kafr Musa) is a village in central Syria, administratively part of the Homs Governorate, located south of Homs. Nearby localities include Ghassaniya to the north, Damina al-Gharbiya to the east, al-Qusayr to the southeast, Arjoun to the south and al-Houz to the east. According to the Central Bureau of Statistics (CBS), Kafr Mousa had a population of 1,610 in the 2004 census. Its inhabitants are predominantly Sunni Muslims.

== Bibliography ==
- Smith, Eli; Robinson, Edward (1841). Biblical Researches in Palestine, Mount Sinai and Arabia Petraea: A Journal of Travels in the Year 1838. Vol. 3. Crocker and Brewster.
