= Daminah al-Sharqiyah =

Daminah al-Sharqiyah دمينة الشرقية
- Village
- Location in Syria
- Coordinates: 34°34′38″N 36°40′40″E
- Country: Syria
- Governorate: Homs Governorate
- District: Al-Qusayr District
- Nahiyah: Al-Qusayr

Population (2004)
  - Total: 1,893
- Time zone: UTC+3 (EET)
  - Summer (DST): UTC+2 (EEST)

Daminah al-Sharqiyah (Arabic: دمينة الشرقية) is a village in central Syria, administratively part of the Homs Governorate, south of Homs. Nearby localities include Shinshar to the northeast, al-Buwaida al-Sharqiya to the northwest and al-Qusayr to the southwest. According to the Central Bureau of Statistics, Daminah al-Sharqiyah had a population of 1,893 in the 2004 census.

In 1838 Daminah al-Sharqiyah was classified as an abandoned village by English scholar Eli Smith.

== Bibliography ==
- Smith, Eli; Robinson, Edward (1841). Biblical Researches in Palestine, Mount Sinai and Arabia Petraea: A Journal of Travels in the Year 1838. Vol. 3. Crocker and Brewster.
