= Jusiyah al-Amar =

Syrian village in the Homs Governorate

Jusiyah al-Amar جوسية العمار
- Village
- Location in Syria
- Coordinates: 34°25′31″N 36°33′18″E
- Country: Syria
- Governorate: Homs
- District: Al-Qusayr
- Subdistrict: Al-Qusayr

Population (2004)
  - Total: 3,447
- Time zone: UTC+2 (EET)
  - Summer (DST): UTC+3 (EEST)
- City Qrya Pcode: C2707

Jusiyah al-Amar (Arabic: جوسية العمار), or simply Jusiyah, is a village in central Syria administratively part of the al-Qusayr District of Homs Governorate. It is located near the border of Lebanon. According to the Syria Central Bureau of Statistics (CBS), Jusiyah al-Amar had a population of 3,447 in the 2004 census.
