= Lake Homs =

- Lake Qattinah
- بحيرة حمص (Arabic); بحيرة قطينة (Arabic)
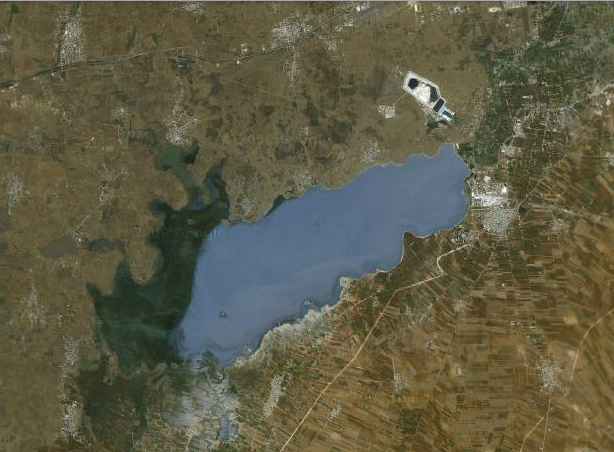
- Satellite image of Lake Homs

- Location within Syria
- Location: Homs Governorate
- Coordinates: 34.6434°N 36.5728°E
- Type: Reservoir
- Primary inflows: Orontes River
- Primary outflows: Orontes River
- Basin countries: Syria
- Surface area: 60 km^{2} (23 sq mi)
- Settlements: Homs

Lake Homs (Arabic: بحيرة حمص) (also called Lake Qattinah, Arabic: بحيرة قطينة) is a lake near Homs, Syria, fed by the Orontes River. The Orontes is also the lake's main outflow. The lake is 15 km (9.3 mi) from the city of Homs, and spans over 60 km^{2} (23 sq mi).

The lake is artificial, created by the Lake Homs Dam at its northern end. The dam's original structure was one of the most visible works of ancient engineering in Syria and in the Fertile Crescent. Built by the ancient Romans, the dam had created a reservoir whose water was conducted to nearby fields through a network of canals.

== Bibliography ==
- Dumper, Michael; Stanley, Bruce E.; Abu-Lughod, Janet L. (2007), Cities of the Middle East and North Africa: A Historical Encyclopedia, ABC-CLIO, ISBN 978-1-57607-919-5
