= Al-Ghassaniyah, Homs =

al-Ghassaniya الغسانية al-Ghassaniyeh
- Village
- Location in Syria
- Coordinates: 34°35′53″N 36°33′5″E
- Country: Syria
- Governorate: Homs Governorate
- District: al-Qusayr District
- Nahiyah: Al-Qusayr

Population (2004)
  - Total: 4,509
- Time zone: UTC+3 (EET)
  - Summer (DST): UTC+2 (EEST)

Al-Ghassaniya (Arabic: الغسانية also spelled Ghassaniyeh) is a town in central Syria, administratively part of the Homs Governorate, located south of Homs and just east of Lake Qattinah. Nearby localities include Kafr Mousa to the south, district capital al-Qusayr 13 kilometers to the southeast, al-Buwaida al-Sharqiya to the east and Qattinah to the northeast.

According to the Syrian Central Bureau of Statistics (CBS), al-Ghassaniya had a population of 4,509 in the 2004 census. Its inhabitants are predominantly Christians and there is a minority of Murshidiyeen, who are members of a heterodox offshoot of the Alawites. The village was bombed in April 2018. The village's main source of income is from agriculture and residents mostly grow cabbage and potatoes. However, fishing is also a major economic sector.

During the Syrian civil war, al-Ghassaniya was besieged by anti-government rebels for roughly eight months between September and May 2013. According to residents, the rebels were based in the surrounding villages and prevented them from using the road. Thus, they were required to obtain food products and petrol by using Lake Qattinah to access villages on the other sides of the lake, particularly Debbine on the southwestern shore. The Syrian Army recaptured the village in early May and the siege was subsequently lifted.
