= Al-Qusayr District =

Al-Qusayr District منطقة القصير
- District
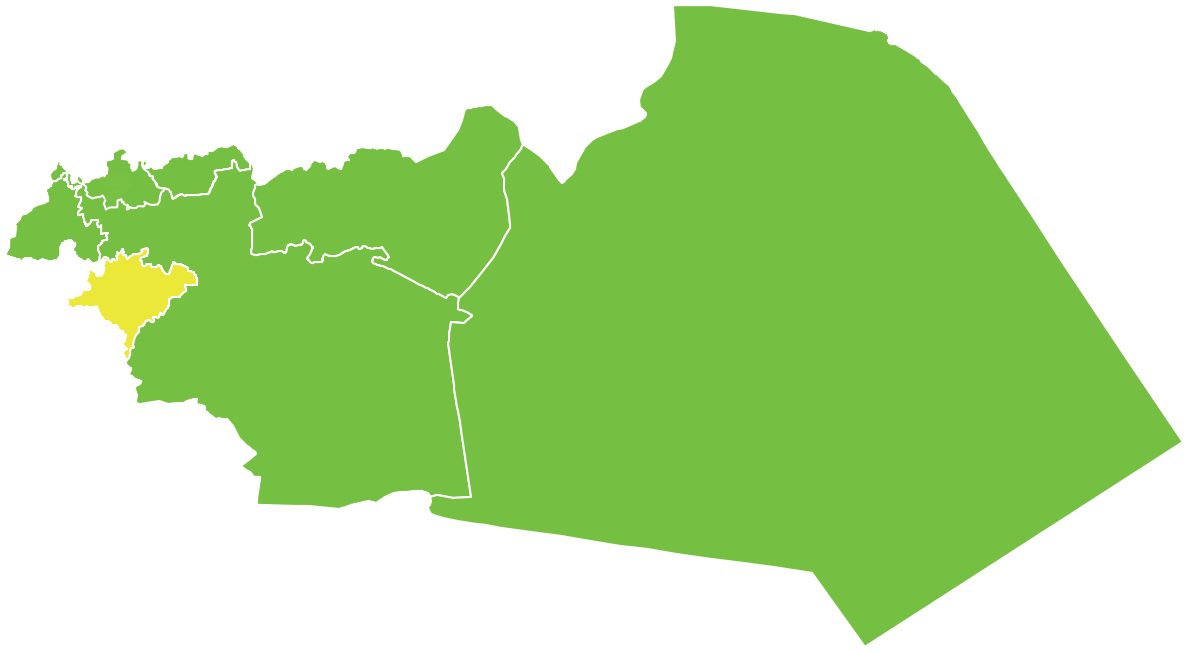
- Map of Al-Qusayr District within Homs Governorate
- Coordinates (Al-Qusayr): 34.5119°N 36.5764°E
- Country: Syria
- Governorate: Homs
- Seat: Al-Qusayr
- Subdistricts: 1 nawāḥī

Area
  - Total: 598.8 km^{2} (231.2 sq mi)

Population (2004)
  - Total: 107,470
  - Density: 179.5/km^{2} (464.8/sq mi)
- Geocode: SY0402

Al-Qusayr District (Arabic: منطقة القصير, romanized: manṭiqat al-Qusair) is a district (manṭiqat) of the Homs Governorate, Syria. According to the 2004 census, the district had a population of 107,470.

== History ==
Al-Qusayr was a rural district which had benefited from the agrarian reforms implemented by the Syrian government during the 1960s and 1970s. Due to its proximity to Lebanon, cross-border trade and smuggling contributed to the economy of the district. In the late 2000s, the economy began to weaken and the district became an opposition stronghold during the 2011 Syrian revolution against the government. The government responded by deploying the military and the city of Al-Qusayr was besieged by the government forces in November 2011. During the summer of 2012, opposition groups took control of parts of the district.

The Syrian Arab Army (SAA) continued to attack the opposition forces and civilians in the district. In 2013, the SAA, supported by Hezbollah, launched a major offensive to retake the district. Due to the Syrian Civil War, the district underwent extensive damage to infrastructure and displacement of people. Agricultural production in the district was severely affected by damage to irrigation infrastructure. A 2024 report estimated that more than 20,000 ha (49,000 acres) of irrigated agricultural land in the district had dried up and ceased cultivation due to the destruction of approximately half of the district's 6,000 wells and 11,000 pumping facilities.

As per a report by Der Spiegel in 2015, the district allegedly hosted a underground nuclear facility. In October 2024, Israel bombed and destroyed the site. A January 2026 report by the Ministry of Foreign Affairs of the Netherlands reported 19 violent incidents in the district between 1 May and 31 December 2025.

== Geography ==
Al-Qusayr District is one of the six administrative districts (manṭiqat) of Homs Governorate, Syria. It is located about 10 km (6.2 mi) from the Lebanon-Syria border.

=== Administrative sub-divisions ===
Al-Qusayr District consists of a single sub-district (nawāḥī) of Al-Qusayr. According to the Central Bureau of Statistics, the following towns and villages make up the district of Al-Qusayr:

- al-Qusayr 29818 / (Arabic: القصير)
- al-Hoz 2239 / (Arabic: الحوز)
- Rablah 5328 / (Arabic: ربلة)
- al-Ghassaniyah 4509 / (Arabic: الغسانية)
- al-Aqrabiyah (al-Buwaydah al-Gharbiyah) 4326 (Arabic: العقربية_البويضة الغربية)
- al-Nizariyah 3813 / (Arabic: النيزارية)
- Jusiyah al-Amar 3447 / (Arabic: جوسية العمار)
- al-Buwaydah al-Sharqiyah 3196 / (Arabic: البويضة الشرقية)
- al-Dabaa 3129 / (Arabic: الضبعة)
- Shinshar 3118 / (Arabic: شنشار)
- Dahiyat al-Majd 3061 / (Arabic: ضاحية المجد)
- Zita al-Gharbiyah 2922 / (Arabic: زيتا الغربية)
- Arjoun 2465 / (Arabic: عرجون)
- an-Naim 2290 / (Arabic: الناعم)
- Zira'ah 2250 / (Arabic: زراعة)
- Daminah al-Sharqiyah 1893 / (Arabic: دمينة الشرقية)
- Jubaniyah (Ramtout) 1857 / (Arabic: (جوبانية (رام توت)
- Dibbin 1696 / (Arabic: دبين)
- Kafr Mousa 1610 / (Arabic: كفر موسى)
- al-Qurniyah 1329 / (Arabic: القرنية)
- Mudan 1230 / (Arabic: مودان)
- Bluzah 1159 / (Arabic: بلوزة)
- Tell al-Nabi Mando (Qadesh) 1068 /(Arabic: تل النبي مندو_قادش)
- al-Hawi (al-Haweek) 1050 / (Arabic: الحاوي_الحاويك)
- Husseiniya 1018 / (Arabic: الحسينية)
- Daminah al-Gharbiyah 1012 / (Arabic: دمينة الغربية)
- Samaqiat Gharbiyah 866 / (Arabic: سماقيات غربية)
- Samaqiat Sharqiyah 864 / (Arabic: سماقيات شرقية)
- al-Souadiyah 861 / (Arabic: السوادية)
- Hawsh Murshed Samaan 802 / (Arabic: حوش مرشد سمعان)
- al-Fadhliyah 798 / (Arabic: الفاضلية)
- al-Burhaniyah (al-Radwaniyah) 744 / (Arabic: البرهانية_الرضوانية)
- al-Saloumiyah 725 / (Arabic: السلومية)
- al-Shoumariyah 713 / (Arabic: الشومرية)
- Diyabiyah 698 / (Arabic: ديابية)
- Ras al-Ain (Hasabiyah) 690 / (Arabic: رأس العين_حسابية)
- Saqirjah (Ain al-Tannour) 674 / (Arabic: سقرجة_عين التنور)
- al-Sakher (Hit) 656 / (Arabic: الصخر_هيت)
- Abou Jouri 652 / (Arabic: أبو جوري)
- al-Masriyah 618 / (Arabic: المصرية)
- Hawsh al-Said Ali 541 / (Arabic: حوش السيد علي)
- al-Nahriyah 529 / (Arabic: النهرية)
- al-Hammam 526 / (Arabic: الحمام)
- al-Shiahat 520 / (Arabic: الشياحات)
- Ain al-Safa (Akoum) 506 / (Arabic: عين الصفا_أكوم)
- Kammam 474 / (Arabic: كمام)
- al-Hamra 431 / (Arabic: الحمراء)
- Wadi al-Hourani 379 / (Arabic: وادي الحوراني)
- al-Muh 377 / (Arabic: الموح)
- Umm Haratain Atiq 345 / (Arabic: أم حارتين عتيق)
- al-Aatafiyah 317 / (Arabic: العاطفية)
- al-Khaldiyah 270 / (Arabic: الخالدية)
- al-Masitbah 258 / (Arabic: المصيطبة)
- al-Buwait 181 / (Arabic: البويت)
- Dahiraj 156 / (Arabic: دحيرج)
- Wadi Hanna 138 / (Arabic: وادي حنا)
- al-Andalus 106 / (Arabic: الأندلس)
- Koukran (al-Sadiat) 102 / (Arabic: كوكران_السعديات)
- al-Hamidiyah 64 / (Arabic: الحامدية)
- al-Haidariyah 56 / (Arabic: الحيدرية)

== Demographics ==
According to the 2004 census, the district had a population of 107,470, comprising 55,316 males and 52,154 females. The census recorded 17,711 households, with an average household size of 6.1 people. The illiteracy rate was 10.6% among males and 25.2% among females. About 56.7% of the population were recorded as engaged in paid work, 24.3% were self-employed and 14.7% worked without pay. Approximately 79.0% of the households were recorded as own houses.

According to the United Nations Office for the Coordination of Humanitarian Affairs (UNHCR), an estimated 51,030 people were in need of humanitarian assistance in the Al-Qusayr sub-district in 2024. The UNHCR estimated that approximately 8,800 Lebanese families, comprising 39,900 individuals, were living in the Homs Governorate, with the majority of them residing in Al-Qusayr District.
