= Al-Qusayr, Syria =

Al-Qusayr القصير
- City
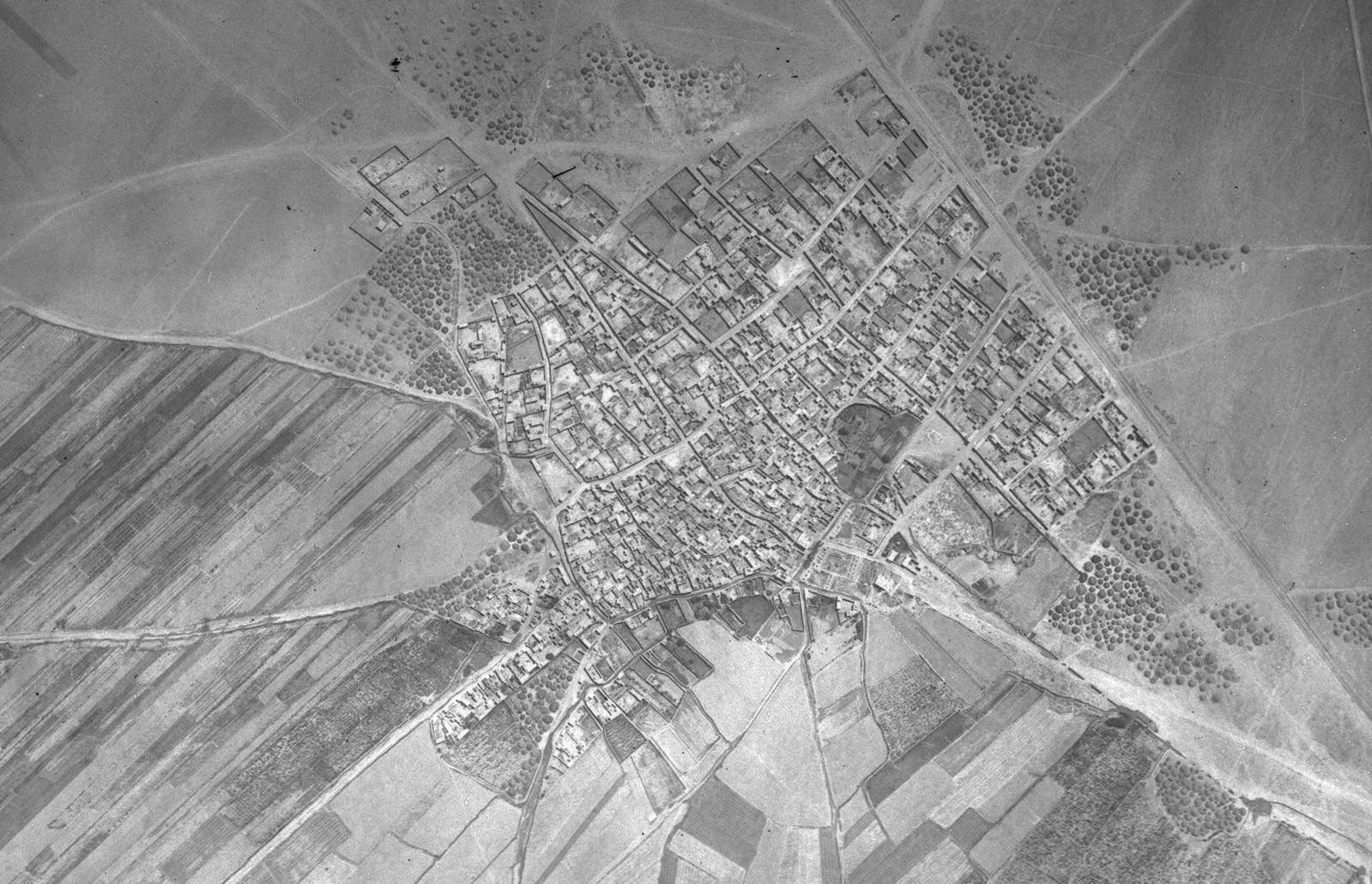
- Aerial view of the city in 1930

- Location in Syria
- Coordinates: 34°30′43″N 36°34′35″E
- Country: Syria
- Governorate: Homs
- District: Al-Qusayr
- Subdistrict: Al-Qusayr
- Elevation: 540 m (1,770 ft)

Population (2004)
  - Total: 29,818
- Time zone: UTC+2 (EET)
  - Summer (DST): +3

Al-Qusayr (Arabic: القصير, romanized: al-Quṣayr, Levantine Arabic pronunciation: [elʔʊˈsˤeːɾ], Standard Arabic: [alqʊˈsˤeːr, alqʊˈsˤɑjr]) is a city in western Syria, administratively part of the Homs Governorate. It is located about 35 kilometers (22 mi) south of Homs and is situated in a mountainous area overlooking Syria's border with Lebanon which lies 15 kilometres (9.3 miles) to the southwest. Nearby localities include Rablah and Zira'a to the south, Jandar further to the east, al-Dabaah to the northeast, Arjoun to the northwest and Aqrabiyah to the west. Al-Qusayr has an altitude of 540 meters (1,770 ft).

A Muslim majority city with a significant Christian minority, al-Qusayr had a population of 29,818 in 2004 according to the Syrian census. In addition to being capital of the al-Qusayr District, it is also the administrative center of the al-Qusayr nahiyah ("subdistrict") which consisted of 60 localities with a collective population of 107,470 in 2004.

== History ==
Al-Qusayr is the closest modern-day city to the ancient walled hilltop city of Qadesh (now the ruins known as Tell Nebi Mend, (c. 1766 ft)) named for the idol worshipped by the ancients at the time and which sits north and above the plain east of the river where historians place the largest known chariot vs. chariot battle in antiquity, the Battle of Qadash, May 1274 BC between the forces of Ramesses II's Egypt and the Anatolian Empire of the Hittites of Muwatalli II.

Arab geographer Yaqut al-Hamawi visited the town in the early 13th century, during Ayyubid rule, and noted al-Qusayr was located north of Damascus, was surrounded by gardens and possessed an extensive khan (caravansary.)

During the Khedivate Egyptian conquest of the Levant in 1832, Ibrahim Pasha, the leader of the campaign, was hosted in al-Qusayr. Following his army's withdrawal, several Egyptian families remained in the town because of its climate and abundant agriculture. Olives, apples, apricots, wheat, barley and potatoes were grown in the area.

=== 2011–2013 Syrian civil war ===
Some of al-Qusayr's inhabitants participated in the 2011–2013 Syrian civil war against the government of Bashar al-Assad. The town became the destination for a number of defectors from the Syrian Army. Between the start of the rebellion in April 2011 and 13 February 2012, at least 70 residents have been killed. Since November 2011, al-Qusayr had been besieged by the army. On 13 February, about 400 army soldiers and pro-government militiamen commandeered the city's main hospital and the municipal hall. There were reportedly several pro-government snipers in the city putting daily life at a standstill and the opposition Free Syrian Army (FSA) had established a base in the city.

The people of al-Qusayr set up a local civilians committee largely to prevent inter-religious strife in the city. Between 7–9 February, the FSA captured a Christian Syrian Army corporal who was cooperating with government forces and whose family, operated an unofficial checkpoint outside al-Qusayr. Afterward, relatives of the corporal kidnapped six Sunni Muslims from the city, killing one in the process. A local mob of anti-government activists subsequently abducted 20 Christians in retaliation. All were released in an exchange deal mediated by the local civilians committee which also stipulated the exile of the corporal and his family from al-Qusayr. On 13 February, the FSA raided and captured the city's mukhabarat (intelligence or security agency) headquarters, killing five military intelligence agents in the process. In June 2012 the military chief of the local FSA branch, Abdel Salam Harba, ordered the remaining thousand of the prior ten thousand Christians to leave al-Qusayr.

Four tanks were sent to the city afterward. However, one of the tanks defected to the opposition together with 30 soldiers. The defected tank managed to take out the other three tanks, killing 20 government soldiers, according to local rebels. The FSA then captured the town hall and hospital, and focused on other government positions. On 25 February, the whole town was controlled by the FSA. Since the government sent no further reinforcements, the 80 remaining government soldiers fled from their posts in al-Qusayr.

On 20 April 2012, Abdel Ghani Jawhar, an explosives expert and commander of the Fatah al-Islam group, detonated himself in al-Qusayr accidentally, while preparing explosive devices. He was wanted in Lebanon for 200 cases of murder, assassinations, attempted assassinations and explosive attacks. On 9 July, Al Jazeera reported that the Free Syrian Army recaptured the town hall, which had served as the main command center for Syrian troops in the area, and demolished it in order to prevent the Syrian government from recapturing it. It was then reported that the Free Syrian Army controlled all of the town except for a few checkpoints and the city's main hospital.

On 4 April 2013 the Syrian army launched an offensive against al-Qusayr, with the aim of capturing all villages around the rebel-held town and eventually the town itself. The Qusayr area is considered of strategic importance because it lies between the capital and the Mediterranean coast, and is close to the Lebanese border.

On 19 May 2013, the Syrian Army attempted to retake al-Qusayr. As of May 2013, there were over 25,000 civilians still living in the city. As of the beginning of June 2013, the Syrian Army regained control over 50% of the city, including the strategic al-Qusayr Military Airbase.

On 5 June 2013, the Syrian Army finally regained control of al-Qusayr, after a rapid overnight attack, allowing some rebel fighters to flee to the neighbouring village of al-Dabaah.

On December 8, 2024, the city was captured by the Syrian opposition during its large-scale offensive led by Tahrir Al-Sham.

== Demographics ==
In 1970 al-Qusayr had a population of 9,240. According to Syria's Central Bureau of Statistics, the city's population in the 2004 census was 29,818. The BBC estimated the population to be around 40,000 in 2011–2012. According to the 2004 census, there were 5,304 households in the city.

In 2012 al-Qusayr had a mixed population of Sunni Muslims and Catholics, along with a few hundred Alawites. Whilst many of the Christians and Alawites were initially driven out after the rebel takeover, following the reassertion of loyalist control in June 2013 approximately 350 Christian families were said to have returned to al-Qusayr, with others having returned to nearby villages such as Rableh. Whilst there have been some allegations of anti-Christian discrimination by the new Syrian government, this has been strongly denied by that government.

== Notable people ==
- Hadi al-Abdullah (born 1987), Syrian citizen journalist
- The father of Albert Cossery, Egyptian-born French writer

== Localities of the subdistrict ==
The following villages and al-Qusayr city make up the nahiyah ("subdistrict") of al-Qusayr according to the Central Bureau of Statistics (CBS).

- al-Qusayr 29,818 / (Arabic: القصير)
- Rablah 5,328 / (Arabic: ربلة)
- al-Ghassaniyah 4,509 / (Arabic: الغسانية)
- al-Aqrabiyah (al-Buwaydah al-Gharbiyah) 4,326 (Arabic: العقربية_البويضة الغربية)
- al-Nizariyah 3,813 / (Arabic: النيزارية)
- Jusiyah al-Amar 3,447 / (Arabic: جوسية العمار)
- al-Buwaydah al-Sharqiyah 3,196 / (Arabic: البويضة الشرقية)
- al-Dabaah 3,129 / (Arabic: الضبعة)
- Shinshar 3,118 / (Arabic: شنشار)
- Dahiyat al-Majd 3,061 / (Arabic: ضاحية المجد)
- Zita al-Gharbiyah 2,922 / (Arabic: زيتا الغربية)
- Arjoun 2,465 / (Arabic: عرجون)
- an-Naim 2,290 / (Arabic: الناعم)
- Zira'ah 2,250 / (Arabic: زراعة)
- al-Hoz 2,239 / (Arabic: الحوز)
- Daminah al-Sharqiyah 1,893 / (Arabic: دمينة الشرقية)
- Jubaniyah (Ramtout) 1,857 / (Arabic: (جوبانية (رام توت)
- Dibbin 1,696 / (Arabic: دبين)
- Kafr Mousa 1610 / (Arabic: كفر موسى)
- al-Qurniyah 1,329 / (Arabic: القرنية)
- Mudan 1,230 / (Arabic: مودان)
- Bluzah 1,159 / (Arabic: بلوزة)
- Tell al-Nabi Mando (Qadesh) 1,068 /(Arabic: تل النبي مندو_قادش)
- al-Hawi (al-Haweek) 1,050 / (Arabic: الحاوي_الحاويك)
- Husseiniya 1,018 / (Arabic: الحسينية)
- Daminah al-Gharbiyah 1,012 / (Arabic: دمينة الغربية)
- Samaqiat Gharbiyah 866 / (Arabic: سماقيات غربية)
- Samaqiat Sharqiyah 864 / (Arabic: سماقيات شرقية)
- al-Souadiyah 861 / (Arabic: السوادية)
- Hawsh Murshed Samaan 802 / (Arabic: حوش مرشد سمعان)
- al-Fadhliyah 798 / (Arabic: الفاضلية)
- al-Burhaniyah (al-Radwaniyah) 744 / (Arabic: البرهانية_الرضوانية)
- al-Saloumiyah 725 / (Arabic: السلومية)
- al-Shoumariyah 713 / (Arabic: الشومرية)
- Diyabiyah 698 / (Arabic: ديابية)
- Ras al-Ain (Hasabiyah) 690 / (Arabic: رأس العين_حسابية)
- Saqirjah (Ain al-Tannour) 674 / (Arabic: سقرجة_عين التنور)
- al-Sakher (Hit) 656 / (Arabic: الصخر_هيت)
- Abou Jouri 652 / (Arabic: أبو جوري)
- al-Masriyah 618 / (Arabic: المصرية)
- Hawsh al-Said Ali 541 / (Arabic: حوش السيد علي)
- al-Nahriyah 529 / (Arabic: النهرية)
- al-Hammam 526 / (Arabic: الحمام)
- al-Shiahat 520 / (Arabic: الشياحات)
- Ain al-Safa (Akoum) 506 / (Arabic: عين الصفا_أكوم)
- Kammam 474 / (Arabic: كمام)
- al-Hamra 431 / (Arabic: الحمراء)
- Wadi al-Hourani 379 / (Arabic: وادي الحوراني)
- al-Muh 377 / (Arabic: الموح)
- Umm Haratain Atiq 345 / (Arabic: أم حارتين عتيق)
- al-Aatafiyah 317 / (Arabic: العاطفية)
- al-Khaldiyah 270 / (Arabic: الخالدية)
- al-Masitbah 258 / (Arabic: المصيطبة)
- al-Buwait 181 / (Arabic: البويت)
- Dahiraj 156 / (Arabic: دحيرج)
- Wadi Hanna 138 / (Arabic: وادي حنا)
- al-Andalus 106 / (Arabic: الأندلس)
- Koukran (al-Sadiat) 102 / (Arabic: كوكران_السعديات)
- al-Hamidiyah 64 / (Arabic: الحامدية)
- al-Haidariyah 56 / (Arabic: الحيدرية)

== Bibliography ==
- le Strange, Guy (1890). "Palestine Under the Moslems: A Description of Syria and the Holy Land from A.D. 650 to 1500". Committee of the Palestine Exploration Fund.
- United States. Office of International Health. Division of Planning and Evaluation (1977). Syncrisis: The Dynamics of Health, Issues 21–24. Office of International Health, Division of Planning and Evaluation; For Sale by the Supt. of Docs., U.S. Govt. Print. Office.
- Smith, Eli; Robinson, Edward (1841). Biblical Researches in Palestine, Mount Sinai and Arabia Petraea: A Journal of Travels in the Year 1838. Vol. 3. Crocker and Brewster.
