= Battle of Rastan =

Battle of Rastan may refer to:

- Battle of Rastan (2011)
- Battle of Rastan (2012)
- May 2012 battle of Rastan

== See also ==
- Siege of Rastan and Talbiseh
