= 1st Armoured Division (Syria) =

Coordinates: 33.3913°N 36.2100°E

- الفرقة المدرعة الأولى
- Syrian Armed Forces Flag
- Active: 1970 – 2024
- Country: Ba'athist Syria (surrendered)
- Allegiance: Syrian Armed Forces (surrendered)
- Branch: Syrian Arab Army (surrendered)
- Type: Armoured division
- Role: Armoured warfare
- Size: up to 15,000 soldiers
- Part of: 2nd Corps (surrendered)
- Garrison/HQ: Al-Kiswah; Douma (61st Brigade); Al-Rastan (171st Brigade)
- Engagements: Yom Kippur War; 1982 Lebanon War; Battle of Jezzine (1982); Battle of Sultan Yacoub; Syrian Civil War; Battle of Rastan (2011); Battle of Rastan (January–February 2012); Idlib Governorate clashes (September 2011 – March 2012); 2012 Homs offensive; Damascus offensive; 2014 Idlib offensive; Aleppo offensive (September–October 2016); Khan al-Shih offensive (October–November 2016); Qalamoun offensive (2017); Central Syria campaign; Eastern Syria campaign (September–December 2017); As-Suwayda offensive (August–November 2018); Operation Dawn of Idlib

Commanders
- Current Commander: Maj. Gen. Maaen Younis al-Kaiem
- Chief of Staff: Brig. Gen. Hussein Mahmoud
- Administrative command: Brig. Gen. Anwar Shamsin (Political Guidance); Brig. Gen. Maan Dahma (Operations); Brig. Gen. Mohammad Abbas (Engineering); Brig. Gen. Hassan Barakat (Reconnaissance)
- Notable commanders: Col. Gen. Ali Habib Mahmud †; Lt. Gen. Ali Aslan; Maj. Gen. Tawfiq Younes; Gen. Ibrahim Al-Safi †; Maj. Gen. Zuheir al-Assad

The 1st Armoured Division (Arabic: الفرقة المدرعة الأولى) was an armored division of the Syrian Arab Army. It was established in 1970 and was part of the 2nd Corps. The 1st Division was the largest formation of the Syrian Arab Army.

== Command structure ==
1st Armoured Division (2020)

- 61st Armoured Brigade
- 91st Armoured Brigade
- 153rd Armoured Brigade
- 57th Mechanized Brigade
- 58th Mechanized Brigade
- 68th Mechanized Brigade
- 171st Infantry Brigade
- 165th Artillery Brigade
- 141st Artillery Regiment
- 167th Anti-tank Regiment

== Combat history ==
=== Yom Kippur War ===
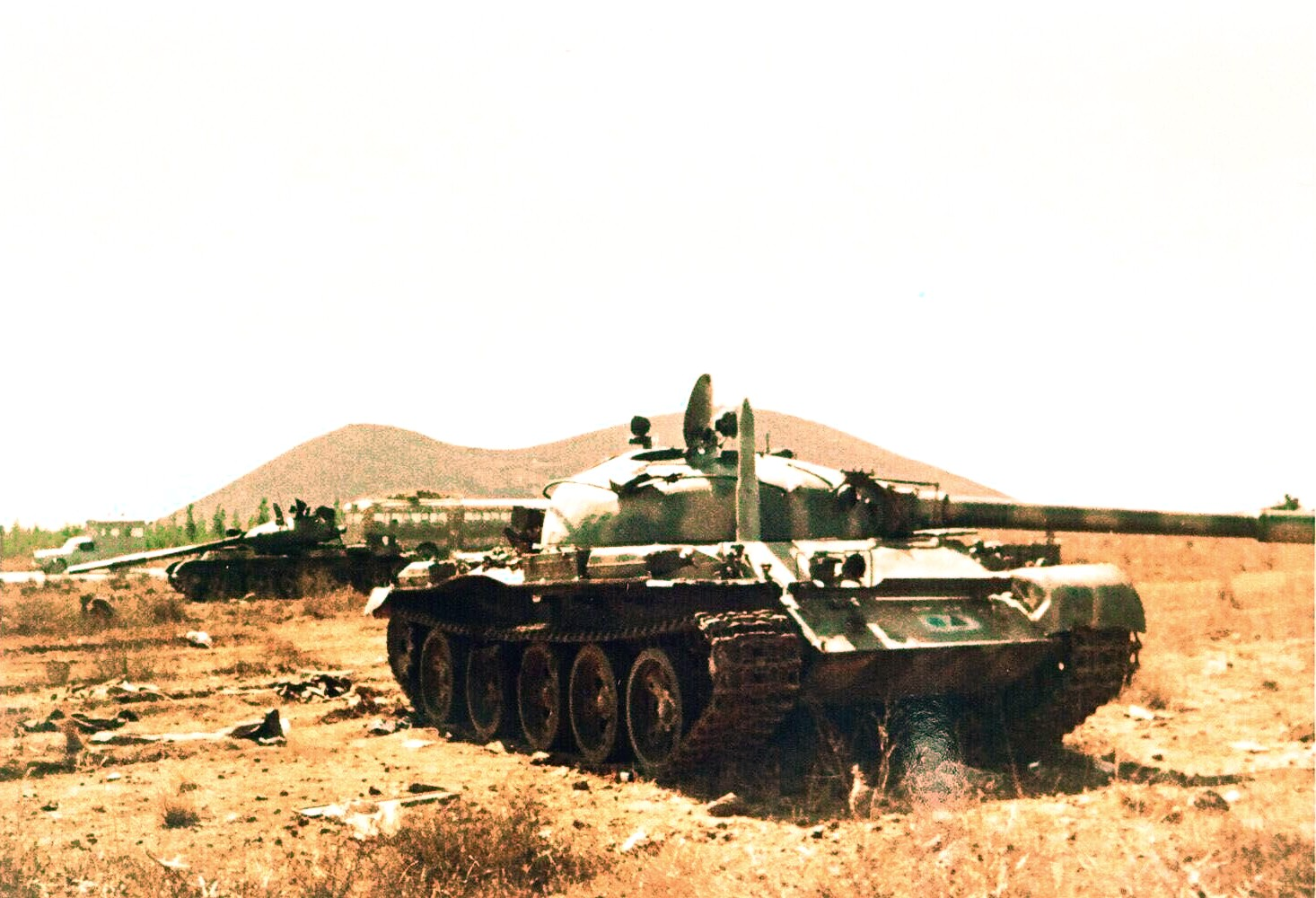
Damaged T-62 tanks of the 91st Armoured Brigade, 1st Division west of Ein Zivan, north of the Kishva axis, in the background Mount Shifon.

During the Syrian Army's assault on the Israeli held Golan Heights during the 1973 Yom Kippur War, the 1st Division was held in reserve until a breakthrough was made on the front line. On the evening of the first day of battle, 6 October, the division was sent forward to follow the success of the 5th Division in the southern breakout part of the line in Khodana and Rafid. From there it was supposed to move towards Hosnia, Ramathnia and past the Blacksmith camp.

The forces of the 5th Division delayed in the areas south of Nafh and in the Al-‘Al area when they encountered stubborn fighting from the remnants of the 188th Armored Brigade of IDF and the first reserve forces that reached the plateau, therefore the 1st Division also delayed in the area. At about 1:30 p.m., forces from the 91st and 43rd brigades (from the 5th Division) managed to arrive and join the fighting in the Nofah. Among other things, the forces of the 91st Brigade fought the force of the 679th Reserve Brigade (IDF) in the junction area Blacksmith, northeast of the camp fences. Dunstan writes that on the evening of the next day, the division commander, Colonel Tewfiq Juhni, had established a supply and administrative complex in the Khishniyah area.

During the next two days, elements of the division fought along the Syrian salient in the southern Golan, taking part in the battles around Nafach, Khishniyah and the area around Al-‘Al. On 10 October, along with other elements of the Syrian Army, the last remnants of the division finally withdrew after hard fighting against the Israeli defenders.

=== 1982 Lebanon War ===
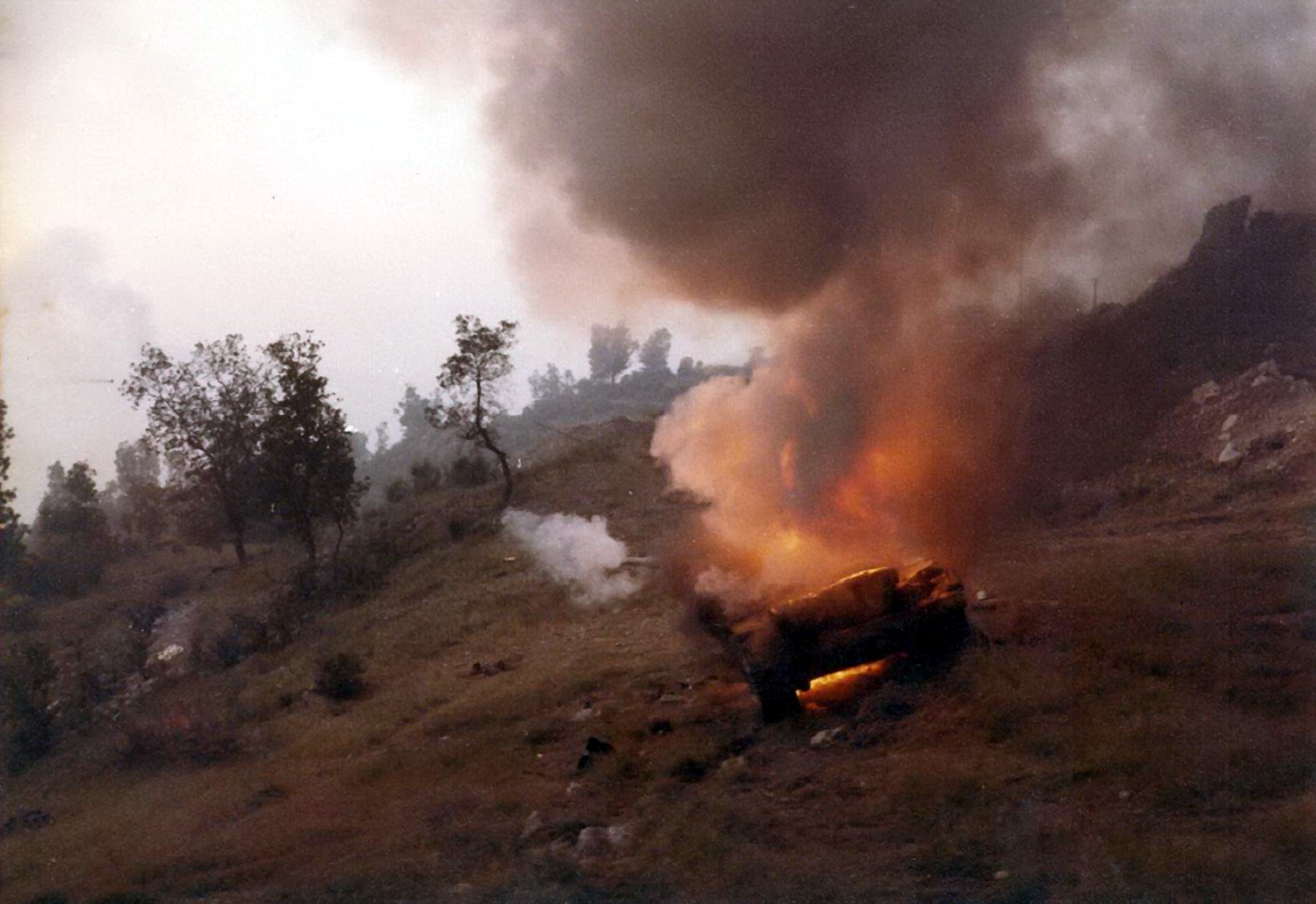
Syrian tank from the 76th Brigade burns in Battle of Jezin, where tanks were sent to defend the town against the IDF advance.

At the outbreak of the Lebanon War, the entire division was stationed in the Bekaa Valley. At the time, it was composed of the 91st Armoured Brigade, the 76th Armoured Brigade and the 58th Mechanized Brigade. Each armoured brigade contained about 160 tanks, and the mechanized brigade consisted of about 40, which added up to a division total of about 360 tanks (usually T-62s). In addition to these units, the 20th Commando Regiment was under the command of the division. It which was primarily used in the anti-tank role. The first clash between Syrian forces and the Israeli army forces occurred near the town of Jezzine, in the southern part of the valley. To protect the town against the advancing Israeli forces, infantry units and elements of the 76th Armoured Brigade were dispatched. In the ensuing battle, the IDF managed to defeat the Syrian forces and occupy the town.

A few days later, the division again fought forces of the IDF, who attacked the division on 11 June 1982, in the Battle of Sultan Yacoub. During this battle, the 91st and 76th Brigades were in the line while the 58th remained in reserve. At the same time forces of the 3rd Armoured Division began moving south along the Bekaa Valley to help against the Israeli attack. Finally, after heavy fighting, the division successfully staved off the Israeli troops and continued to hold the eastern part of the Beirut - Damascus line. Despite the losses the Syrians suffered, this battle is considered a great success because the Israeli effort was curbed.

=== 21st century ===
The division was subordinate to the 2nd Corps, whose headquarters are in Al-Zabadani, north-west of Damascus, on the border of Lebanon. The corps has responsibility for the entire area north of Damascus to Homs including Lebanon. Corps forces were set up in Lebanon during the Syrian presence there, which lasted from 1976 to 2005. The 1st Division itself is currently headquartered at the Al-Kiswah base, south of Damascus.

In 2001, according to Richard Bennett, the division was composed of three brigades, the 44th Armoured, 46th Armoured, and the 42nd Mechanized.

==== Syrian Civil War ====
According to Holliday, by the beginning of 2012, the division consisted of the 76th, 91st, and 153rd Armoured Brigades, the 58th Mechanized Brigade, and an artillery regiment. Between February and April 2012, the 76th Armoured Brigade '..conducted a series of violent clearance operations in rural Idlib Governorate, during which its soldiers committed numerous atrocities across a swath of Syrian villages and left behind graffiti proclaiming the work of the "Death Brigade".

According to Gregory Waters, circa 2017-18 the division consists of the 57th, 58th, 61st, 68th, 91st and 171st Brigades, plus artillery and smaller units, with only the 58th and 91st Brigades dating from before 2011. The division's brigades (57th, 76th, 91st Armored and 58th mechanized) lost between 40%-65% of their heavy equipment (e.g. tanks and armoured vehicles). In 2018, the 61st Brigade opened a recruitment office in Douma, Damascus, from which it recruits former opposition members in the area, while the 171st Brigade recruited heavily among Republican Guard defectors who fought in the Al-Rastan region and surrendered in early 2018.

In mid-2018 reports indicated that the 1st Armoured Division was reorganized and rebuilt under Russian supervision. The 61st Brigade has been "entirely restored" by the Russians and "is the largest and most important combat brigade in the Syrian Arab Army". At the end of 2018, the division underwent further change as part of the rebuilding of the Syrian Army with the help of Russia. Of the units that made up the division, only the 91st Armored and 58th Mechanized Brigades remained as they were, while the 76th moved to 6th Division and 153rd Brigade ceased to exist.

As their replacement, the 171st, 68th, 61st and 57th Brigades were established. After the rehabilitation of 1st Division, each armored brigade contains: three Armored Battalions, (each 41 tanks), Mechanized Battalion (each 31 BMPs), Artillery Battalion (18 portable cannons) and Shilka Air Defense Battalion. Each Mechanized brigade contains: one Armored Battalion (each 33 tanks), three Mechanized Battalions, (each 31 BMPs) and Artillery Battalion (18 portable cannons). The last battle engagements of the division were As-Suwayda offensive (August–November 2018) and Operation Dawn of Idlib.
