= Tahajjud =

Voluntary night prayer in Islam

- Official name: صَلَاةُ الْتَهَجُّد
- Also called: Night supererogatory prayer
- Observed by: Muslims
- Type: Islamic
- Significance: A Muslim prayer offered to God after Isha prayer.
- Observances: Sunnah prayers
- Begins: After a night's sleep
- Ends: Fajr prayer
- Frequency: 2 rakah minimum
- Related to: Salah, Nafl prayer, Five Pillars of Islam

Tahajjud, (Arabic: تَهَجُّد) also known as the "night prayer" or "Qiyam-u-lail", as well as "Namaaz-e-Shab" (نماز شب) in Persian (later borrowed into Urdu and Hindi) is a voluntary prayer performed by followers of Islam. It is not one of the five obligatory prayers required of all Muslims, although the Islamic prophet Muhammad was recorded as performing the tahajjud prayer regularly himself and encouraging his companions. The Tahajjud prayer is usually performed in the last third of the night, when Allāh descends to the lowest of the heavens to answer supplications.

== Evidence in ==
Next to these Qur'anic verses, there also exist a number of hadiths (narrated and confirmed traditions from Muhammad) that reinforce the importance of Tahajjud Prayer. In various hadiths, it has been mentioned as Qiyamul Sabah (standing of morning), Salatul Sabah (prayer of morning) and Tahajjud.

== Recommended time ==
To perform tahajjud signifies the act of rising from sleep during the night and then praying.

Tahajjud may be performed before or after imsak (imsak is when the fasting starts) but before the obligatory Fajr prayer.

Commenting on this subject, Ibn Hajar says:

There was no specific time in which the Prophet (peace and blessings be upon him) would perform his very early morning Prayer; but he used to do whatever was easiest for him.

"The best time for tahajjud is the last third portion of the night." (Abu Hurairah: Fiqh)

`Amr ibn `Absah claimed that he heard Muhammad as saying:

The closest that a servant comes to his Lord is during the middle of the latter portion of the night. If you can be among those who remember Allah the Exalted One at that time, then do so.

— At-Tirmidhi

Masruq ibn al-Ajda' narrated:

I asked `Aisha which deed was most loved by the Prophet. She said, "A deed done continuously." I further asked, "When did he used to get up (in the night for the prayer)." She said, "He used to get up on hearing the crowing of a cock."

— Muhammad al-Bukhari

== Number of rakats ==
Tahajjud Prayer does not entail a specific number of rak`ahs that must be performed, nor is there any maximum limit that may be performed. It would be fulfilled even if one prayed just one rak`ah of Witr after `Ishaa'; however, it is traditionally prayed with at least two rak'at which is known as shif'a followed by witr as this is what Muhammad did before fajr.

Abdullah ibn Umar narrated that Muhammad said:

"Salatul Layl (Night Prayer, i.e. Tahajjud) is offered as two rak'at followed by two rak'at and (so on) and if anyone is afraid of the approaching dawn (Fajr prayer) he should pray one rak'at and this will be a Witr for all the rak'at which he has prayed before."

— Abdullah ibn Umar

Bukhari, Hadith 990
