= Battle of Rastan (May 2012) =

Coordinates: 34.91525°N 36.735485°E

- Part of the Syrian Civil War
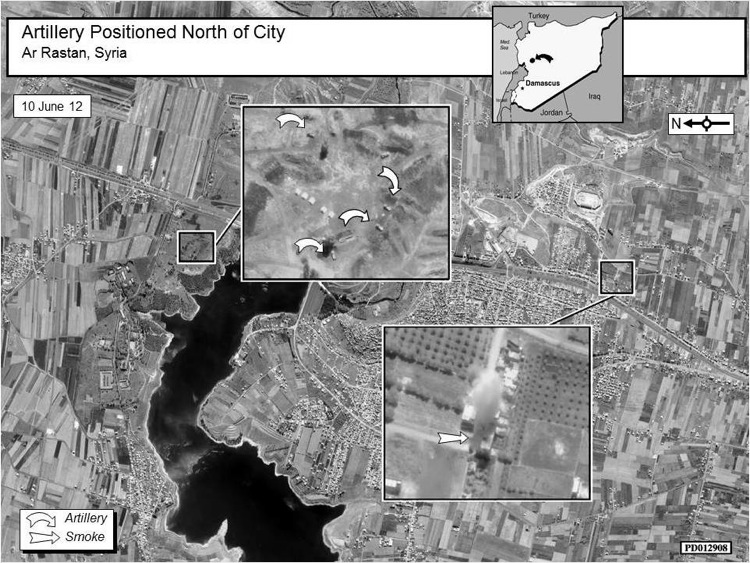
- Artillery positioned north of Rastan, Syria. Smoke rising from building, 10 June 2012.
Date	14 May 2012
Location	Rastan, Homs Governorate, Syria
Result	Syrian opposition victory

Belligerents
(Syrian opposition) Syrian Opposition	(Syria) Syrian Government

Commanders and leaders
(Syrian opposition) Col. Qassem Saadeddine; (Syrian opposition) Capt. Iyad al-Deek; (Syrian opposition) Ahmad Bahbouh; (Syrian opposition) Maj. Ali Ayoub; (Syrian opposition) Lt. Ibrahim Ayoub; (Syrian opposition) Capt. Bewar Mustafa	(Ba'athist Syria) Unknown

Units involved
Free Syrian Army; Khalid ibn al-Walid Brigade; Men of God Brigade	Syrian Armed Forces; Syrian Army; Syrian Air Force

Casualties and losses
9 killed, including a commander	23 killed 15 captured 3 APCs destroyed 2 APCs captured

The Battle of Rastan between the Syrian Armed Forces and the Free Syrian Army took place in the city of Rastan on 14 May 2012, during the U.N. brokered cease-fire of the conflict.

== Background ==
The area near Rastan was scene of the first serious armed confrontations between rebels and the Syrian Army through 2011. the Syrian Army regained control of the city several times, but it has kept slipping back into rebel hands. Its strategic location along the road which links the capital Damascus to the north of the country and the terrain had helped deserters from disparate units mount raids against Syrian army buses and roadblocks defended by Military Intelligence and pro-government militia.

== Events ==
According to the Syrian Observatory for Human Rights, on 14 May, 23 Syrian soldiers were killed in the town of Rastan in heavy clashes with rebels, who destroyed three armored personnel carriers. Earlier, opposition sources said a local rebel commander was among scores of people killed in heavy army shelling of Rastan, Reuters reported. One report said nine peopled died in the shelling. An additional two military armored personnel carriers were reportedly captured by the rebels, along with 15 soldiers.

== Aftermath ==
In June, Syrian troops bombarded Rastan using helicopters and mortars, killing and wounding a large number of rebel fighters, including Ahmad Bahbouh, head of the rebel military office in Rastan. United Nations monitors confirmed that Syrian Air Force helicopters fired on towns near Homs, including Rastan. For the first time, the UN also verified repeated allegations by activists that government forces fired from helicopters in the military crackdown on dissent. Kofi Annan said he was "gravely concerned" at this news and a UN spokeswoman said that "artillery and mortar shelling, machine guns and smaller arms" were being used against the towns of Rastan and Talbiseh.

On 13 July, a colonel with 40 soldiers and four tanks defected to the Free Syrian Army in Rastan. Rebel fighters also took control of the village of al-Ghantu, southwest of Talbiseh.

== See also ==
- 2012 Homs offensive
- Battle of Damascus (2012)
- Battle of Raqqa (2013)
