= Early insurgency phase of the Syrian civil war =

Part of the Syrian Civil War

Early insurgency phase of the Syrian Civil War
- Part of the Syrian revolution and the Syrian civil war
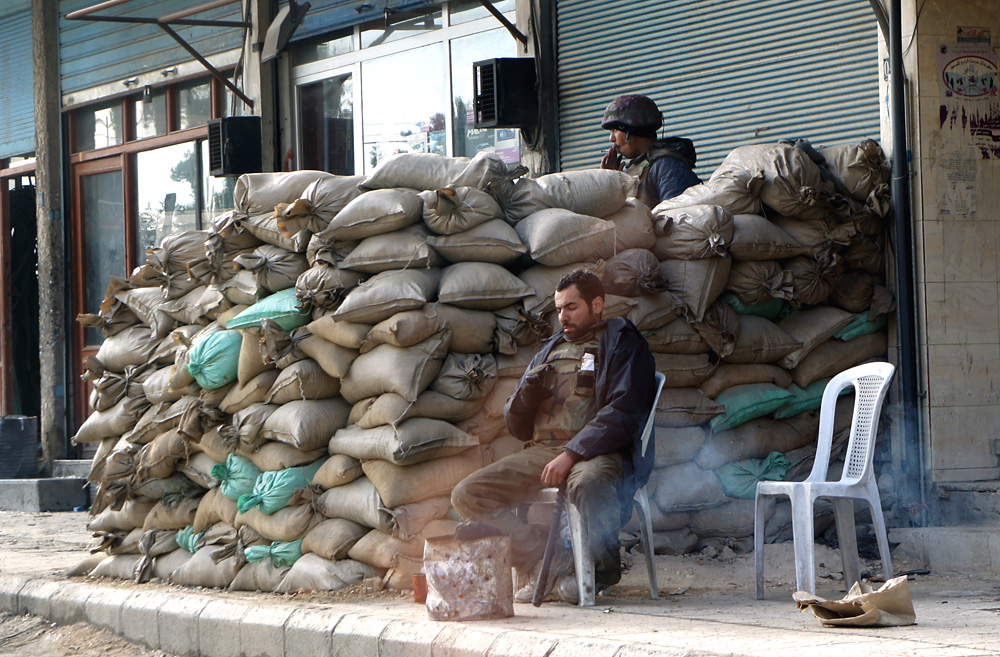
- Syrian Arab Army checkpoint in Douma, January 2012
Date	29 July 2011 – 20 April 2012 (8 months, 3 weeks and 1 day)
Location	Syria, neighbouring countries
Result	Inconclusive: UN-mediated truce; General cease of hostilities in late April and early May; Cease-fire collapse and conflict escalation by June 2012

Belligerents
(Ba'athist Syria) Syrian government; Ba'ath Party; Syrian Arab Armed Forces; People's Army; Ba'ath Brigades; Syrian Police; Shabiha; Popular Committees; Military Intelligence Directorate; Air Force Intelligence Directorate; General Intelligence Directorate	Syrian opposition; Al-Nusra Front; (Syrian opposition) Free Syrian Army; Liwa al-Islam; Ahrar al-Sham; (Syrian opposition) Syrian Martyrs' Brigades; (Syrian opposition) Idlib Military Council; Suqour al-Sham Brigades; Nour al-Din al-Zenki Movement; Other rebel groups

Commanders and leaders
(Ba'athist Syria) Bashar al-Assad (President of Syria) (Ba'athist Syria) Maher al-Assad (4th Division Commander) (Ba'athist Syria) Dawoud Rajiha (Defense Minister) (Ba'athist Syria) Fahd Jassem al-Freij (Chief of the General Staff) (Ba'athist Syria) Assef Shawkat (Deputy Defense Minister) (Ba'athist Syria) Ali Abdullah Ayyoub (Deputy Chief of Staff) (Ba'athist Syria) Issam Hallaq (Chief of Air Force Staff) (Ba'athist Syria) Rafiq Shahadah (Military Intelligence head) (Ba'athist Syria) Jamil Hassan (Air Force Intelligence head) (Ba'athist Syria) Mohammad al-Shaar (Interior Minister) (Ba'athist Syria) Walid Muallem (Foreign Minister) (Ba'athist Syria) Mohammed Dib Zaitoun (General Intelligence head)	Abu Mohammad al-Julani (Al-Nusra Front commander) (Syrian opposition) Riad al-Asaad (Free Syrian Army commander); Zahran Alloush (Liwa al-Islam commander); Hassan Aboud (Ahrar al-Sham commander) (Syrian opposition) Jamal Maarouf (Syrian Martyrs' Brigade commander) (Syrian opposition) Afif Suleiman (Idlib Military Council commander); Ahmed Issa al-Sheikh (Suqour al-Sham Brigades commander); Sheikh Tawfiq Shahabuddin (Nour al-Din al-Zenki Movement commander)

Strength
Syrian Army: ~60,000 (Note: Though the Syrian Army officially comprised around 220,000 soldiers at the start of the insurgency, including active and reserve personnel, more than half of these troops either defected to the insurgents or refused to answer calls of mobilization. As result, the army was limited to about 60,000 men in 2011.); Security agencies and affiliated paramilitaries: ~200,000; Ba'ath Party militias: tens of thousands Shabiha: 5,000–10,000	(Syrian opposition) 60,000 fighters (Rebel claim)

Casualties and losses
Syrian security forces: 3,770 (opposition sources)–3,857 (government sources: 15 March 2011–21 June 2012) soldiers and policemen killed	Syrian rebels: 2,980–3,235 fighters killed
- Civilian casualties (including 1,800–2,154 civilians killed during civil uprising): 10,414–10,669 killed overall (government claim); 15,200–16,163 killed overall (opposition claims); 35,000 wounded overall (see Deaths below for other estimates on killed); 240,000 displaced (including 180,000 refugees)

The early insurgency phase of the Syrian civil war lasted from late July 2011 to April 2012, and was associated with the rise of armed opposition militias across Syria and the beginning of armed revolution against the Syrian Ba'athist regime ruled by president Bashar al-Assad. Though armed insurrection incidents began as early as June 2011 when rebels killed 120–140 Syrian security personnel, the beginning of organized insurgency is typically marked by the formation of the Free Syrian Army (FSA) on 29 July 2011, when a group of defected officers declared the establishment of the first organized opposition armed group. Composed of defected Syrian Arab Armed Forces personnel, the rebel army aimed to remove Bashar al-Assad and his government from power.

This period of the war saw the initial civil uprising take on many of the characteristics of a civil war, according to several outside observers, including the United Nations Commission on Human Rights, as armed elements became better organized and began carrying out successful attacks in retaliation for the crackdown by the Syrian government on demonstrators and defectors.

The Arab League monitoring mission, initiated in December 2011, ended in failure by February 2012, as Ba'athist government troops and opposition militants continued to do battle across the country while the Assad regime prevented foreign observers from touring active battlefields, including besieged opposition strongholds.

In early 2012, Kofi Annan acted as the UN–Arab League Joint Special Representative for Syria. His peace plan provided for a ceasefire, but even as the negotiations for it were being conducted and afterwards, the rebels and the Syrian army continued fighting.The United Nations-backed ceasefire was brokered by special envoy Kofi Annan and declared in mid-April 2012.

== Background ==
The civil uprising phase of the Syrian Civil War was an early stage of protests, alongside the subsequent violent reaction by the Ba'athist Syrian state and its security forces, lasting from March to 28 July 2011. The uprising, initially demanding democratic reforms, evolved from initially minor protests, beginning as early as January 2011 and transformed into massive protests in March.

The uprising was marked by massive anti-government opposition demonstrations against the Ba'athist dictatorship of Bashar al-Assad, meeting with police and military violence, massive arrests and brutal crackdown, resulting in hundreds of casualties and thousands of wounded.

Despite Bashar al-Assad's attempts to pacify the protests with massive crackdown and use of censorship on one hand and concessions on the other, by the end of April, it became clear the situation was getting out of his control and the Syrian government deployed numerous troops on the ground.

The civil uprising phase created the platform for emergence of militant opposition movements and massive defections from the Syrian Armed Forces, which gradually transformed the conflict from a civil uprising to an armed revolution, and later a full-scale civil war. The rebel Free Syrian Army was created on 29 July 2011, marking the transition into armed insurgency.

== Insurgency timeline ==
During the June 2011 Jisr ash-Shugur operation, the Syrian army claimed to have begun a crackdown on terrorists between 4 and 12 June, which left 120–140 security personnel dead.

=== Formation of FSA (July–November 2011) ===
On 29 July 2011, seven defecting Syrian Armed Forces officers formed the Free Syrian Army (FSA), originally composed of defected Syrian military officers and soldiers, aiming "to bring this government (the Assad government) down" with united opposition forces. On 31 July, a nationwide crackdown nicknamed the "Ramadan Massacre" resulted in the death of at least 142 people and hundreds of injuries. On 23 August, a coalition of anti-government groups called the Syrian National Council was formed. The council, based in Turkey, attempted to organize the opposition. The opposition, however, including the FSA, remained a fractious collection of political groups, longtime exiles, grassroots organizers and armed militants divided along ideological, ethnic and/or sectarian lines.

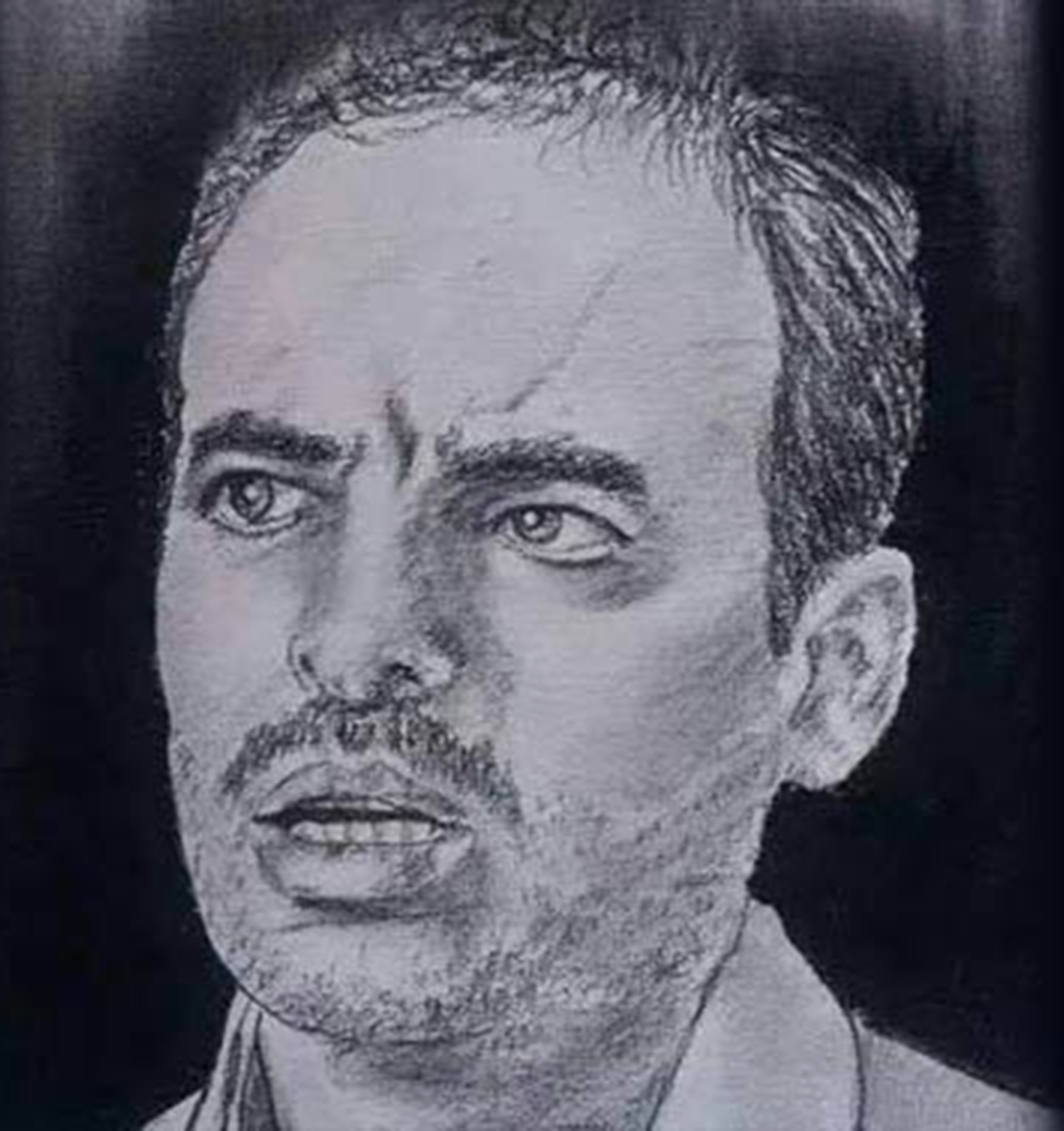
Lt. Col. Hussein Harmoush, founder of the Free Officers Movement of Syria. Harmoush was captured by government forces in August 2011, detained at Sednaya Prison and probably executed.

Throughout August 2011, government forces stormed major urban centres and outlying regions, and continued to attack protests. On 14 August, the Siege of Latakia continued as the Syrian Navy became involved in the military crackdown for the first time. Gunboats fired heavy machine guns at waterfront districts in Latakia, as ground troops and security agents backed by armour stormed several neighbourhoods. The Eid ul-Fitr celebrations, which began at the end of August, were muted after security forces fired on protesters gathered in Homs, Daraa, and the suburbs of Damascus.

By September 2011, Syrian rebels were engaged in an active insurgency campaign in many parts of Syria. A major confrontation between the FSA and the Syrian Armed Forces occurred in Al-Rastan. From 27 September to 1 October, Syrian government forces, backed by tanks and helicopters, led an offensive on the town of Al-Rastan in Homs Governorate, in order to drive out army defectors. The 2011 Battle of Rastan between government forces and the FSA was the longest and most intense action until that time. After a week, the FSA was forced to retreat from Rastan. To avoid government forces, the leader of the FSA, Colonel Riad al-Asaad, retreated to Turkey. Many of the rebels fled to the nearby city of Homs.

By October 2011, the FSA started to receive active support from the Turkish government, which allowed the rebel army to operate its command and headquarters from the country's southern Hatay Province close to the Syrian border, and its field command from inside Syria.

In October 2011, clashes between government and army units which had defected were being regularly reported. During the first week of the month, sustained clashes were reported in Jabal al-Zawiya in the mountains of Idlib Governorate. Syrian rebels also captured most of Idlib city. In mid-October, clashes in Idlib Governorate included the towns of Binnish and Hass in the governorate near the mountain range of Jabal al-Zawiya. In late October, clashes occurred in the northwestern town of Maarrat al-Nu'man between government forces and defected soldiers, and near the Turkish border, where 10 security agents and a deserter were killed in a bus ambush. It was not clear if the defectors linked to these incidents were connected to the FSA.

According to defectors, in 2011 the Syrian government intentionally released imprisoned Islamist militants and provided them with arms "in order to make itself the least bad choice for the international community". On 19 October 2011 U.S. media reported that "large crowds of Syrians rallied in the northern city of Aleppo in support of the government of President Bashar al-Assad". The Syrian government estimated over a million pro-government demonstrators, while others estimated crowds at least "tens of thousands" comparable in size to a pro-government rally "a week earlier in Damascus".

=== Escalation (November 2011 – April 2012) ===
Situation in Syria, mid-March 2012

In early November 2011, clashes between the FSA and security forces in Homs escalated as the siege continued. After six days of bombardment, the Syrian Army stormed the city on 8 November, leading to heavy street fighting in several neighborhoods. Resistance in Homs was significantly greater than that seen in other towns and cities, and some in opposition have referred to the city as the "Capital of the Revolution". Unlike events in Deraa and Hama, operations in Homs failed to quell the unrest.

November and December 2011 saw increasing rebel attacks, as opposition forces grew in number. In the two months, the FSA launched deadly attacks on an air force intelligence complex in the Damascus suburb of Harasta, the Ba'ath Syrian Regional Branch youth headquarters in Idlib Governorate and Damascus, an airbase in Homs Governorate, and an intelligence building in Idlib. On 15 December, opposition fighters ambushed checkpoints and military bases around Daraa, killing 27 soldiers, in one of the largest attacks yet on security forces. The opposition suffered a major setback on 19 December, when a failed defection in Idlib Governorate led to 72 defectors killed.

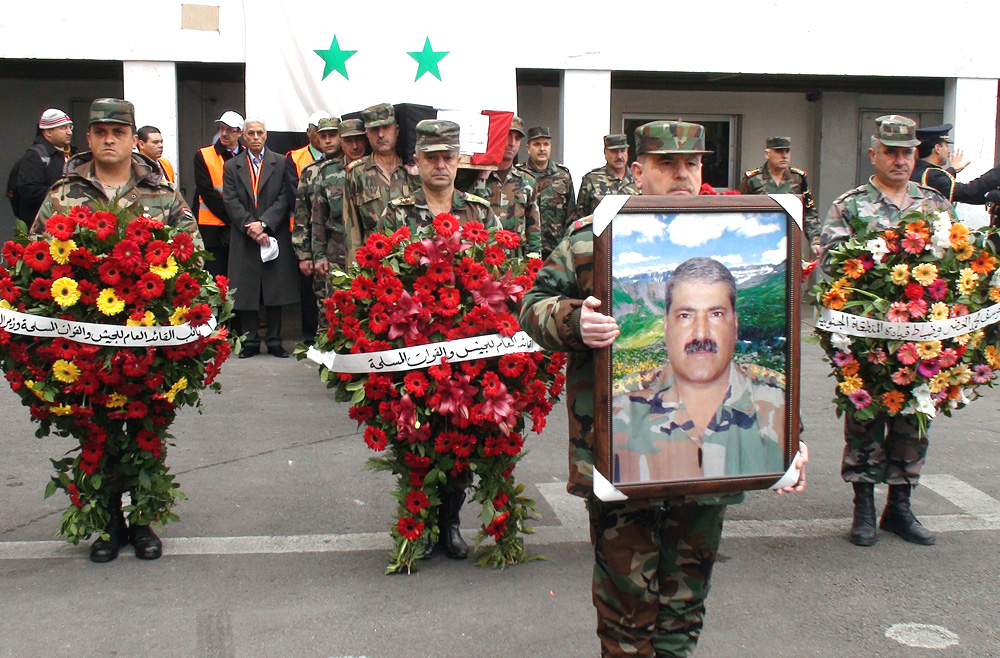
The funeral procession of Syrian General Mohammed al-Awwad who was assassinated in Damascus in January 2012

In January 2012, Assad began using large-scale artillery operations against the insurgency, which led to the destruction of many civilian homes due to indiscriminate shelling. By this time, daily protests had dwindled, eclipsed by the spread of armed conflict. January saw intensified clashes around the suburbs of Damascus, with Syrian Army use of tanks and artillery becoming common. Fighting in Zabadani began on 7 January when the Syrian Army stormed the town in an attempt to root out the FSA presence. After the first phase of the battle ended with a ceasefire on 18 January, leaving the FSA in control of the town, the FSA launched an offensive into nearby Douma. Fighting in the town lasted from 21 to 30 January, before the rebels were forced to retreat as result of a government counteroffensive. Although the Syrian Army managed to retake most of the suburbs, sporadic fighting continued. Fighting erupted in Rastan again on 29 January, when dozens of soldiers manning the town's checkpoints defected and began opening fire on troops loyal to the government. Opposition forces gained complete control of the town and surrounding suburbs on 5 February.

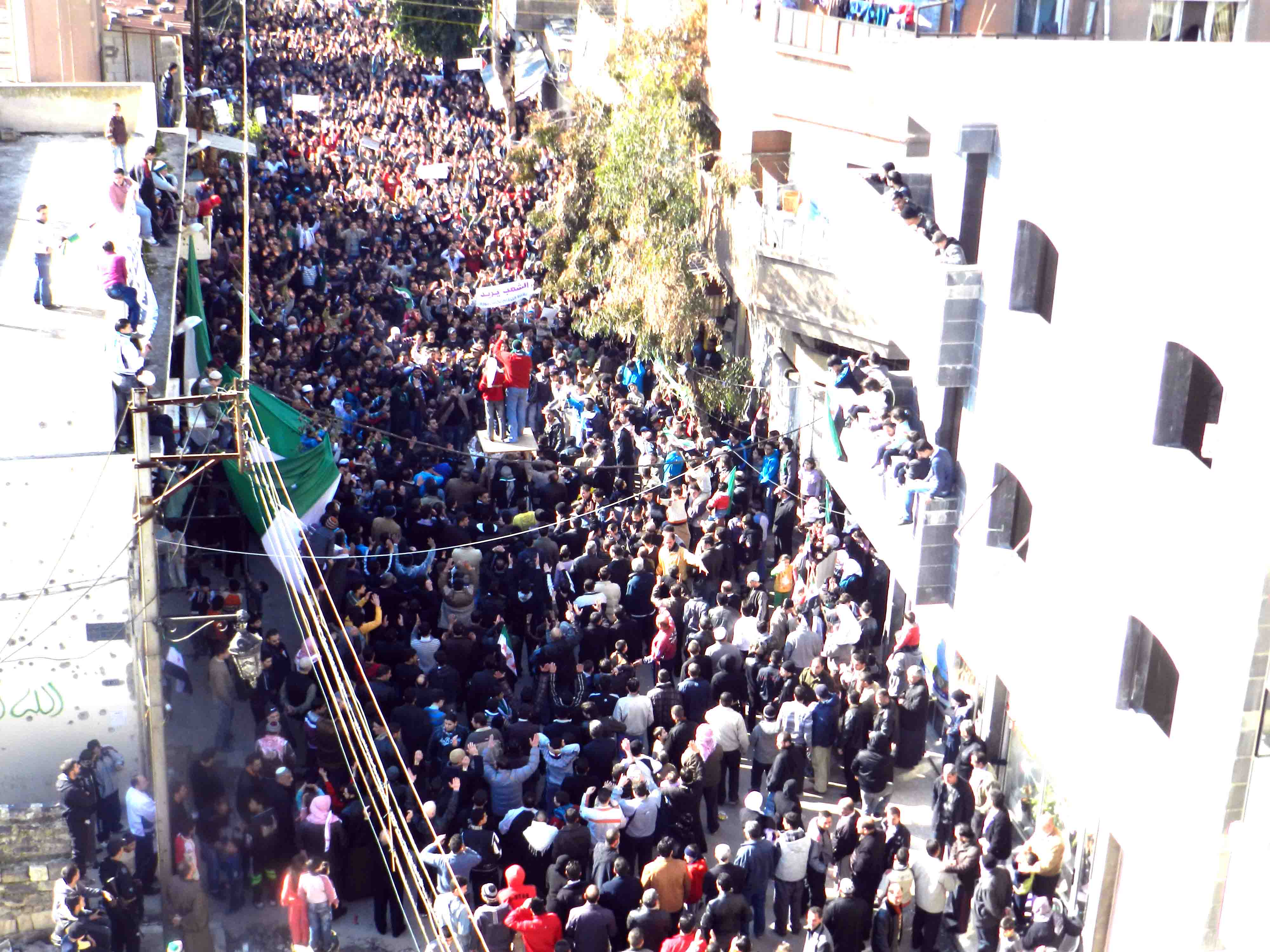
Protest against the Assad regime in the city of Homs, 3 February 2012

On 3 February, the Syrian Army launched a major offensive in Homs to retake rebel-held neighborhoods. In early March, after weeks of artillery bombardments and heavy street fighting, the Syrian Army eventually captured the district of Baba Amr, a rebel stronghold. By the end of March, the Syrian Army retook control of half a dozen districts, leaving them in control of 70 percent of the city. By 14 March, Syrian troops successfully ousted insurgents from the city of Idlib after days of fighting. By early April, the estimated death toll of the conflict, according to activists, reached 10,000. In April 2012, Assad forces began employing attack helicopters against rebel forces.

In early 2012, Kofi Annan acted as the UN–Arab League Joint Special Representative for Syria. His peace plan provided for a ceasefire, but even as the negotiations for it were being conducted, the rebels and the Syrian army continued fighting even after the peace plan.

== Aftermath ==
The United Nations-backed ceasefire was brokered by special envoy Kofi Annan and declared in mid-April 2012, but eventually met a similar fate, with unarmed UN peacekeepers' movements tightly controlled by the government and fighting. By early June 2012, the civil war entered its most violent phase, with fighting spreading all across the country and fatalities mounting in unprecedented numbers. Incommunicado detention, including of children, also continued.

== See also ==
- Timeline of the Syrian civil war
- Arab Winter
