= Battle of Jezzine =

Battle of Jezzine may refer to:

- Battle of Jezzine (1941), part of the Syria-Lebanon campaign of World War II
- Battle of Jezzine (1982), part of the 1982 Lebanon War
