= Farouq Brigades =

Syrian rebel organisation

- كتائب الفاروق
- Logo of the Farouq Brigades
- Leaders: Abdul Razzaq Tlass (October 2011 – 6 October 2012); Osama Juneidi (Abu Sayeh) Taleb al-Dayekh
- Dates active: June 2011 – 2013 (central organization, remnants remained active until 2017)
- Split from: Khalid ibn al-Walid Battalion
- Ideology: Sunni Islamism
- Size: 3,000+ (2011); 10,000+ (2012); 14,000 (own claim) (2013)
- Part of: Free Syrian Army; Syrian Islamic Liberation Front (2012–2013)
- Wars: Syrian Civil War

The Farouq Brigades (Arabic: كتائب الفاروق; also spelt Farooq or Farook) was a Syrian Islamist rebel group formed by a number of Homs-based members of the Free Syrian Army in the early phases of the Syrian Civil War. The group rapidly expanded in size and prominence in 2012, before suffering internal splits and battlefield reversals in 2013 that greatly reduced its influence. By 2014, the group was largely defunct, with its member defecting to other rebel groups. The rebel group were named Farouq after Omar bin al-Khattab, a Sahaba (companion) of the Islamic Prophet Muhammad and the second Caliph.

== History ==
The Farouq Brigades emerged from the central city of Homs just months into the Syrian Civil War. Its beginnings are as a subunit of the Khalid ibn al-Walid Brigade, a group of defectors from the Syrian Army that announced its formation in June 2011 and engaged in clashes with members of the Syrian security forces in Homs and Al-Rastan. The group started out with 3,000+ fighters. During the second half of 2011, Farouq was active in Homs, particularly the Baba Amr neighborhood. It was led by a defector, Lieutenant Abdul Razaq Tlass, who was a nephew of the former Syrian Defense Minister Mustafa Tlass. The apparent success of Farouq in holding territory in Baba Amr led to the Syrian government escalating their use of force in an offensive in early 2012, causing heavy casualties amongst the rebels and forcing their retreat into the Homs countryside and the towns of Al-Qusayr and Al-Rastan.

In the following months, Farouq absorbed preexisting rebel units and formed new ones across Syria, from Daraa in the south near the Jordanian border to the Farouq al-Shemal (Northern Farouq) which controlled some of the border posts in the north with Turkey.

In September 2012, a large number of Islamist rebel brigades, including the Farouq Brigades and the Suquor al-Sham formed the Syrian Islamic Liberation Front, under the leadership of Suquor al-Sham commander Ahmed Abu Issa. Abu Issa claimed the new Front had more than 40,000 fighters, and aimed to establish a state with an Islamic reference. In May 2013, the BBC gave estimate of 20,000 fighters. In November 2013, the SILF was superseded by a new rebel coalition called the Islamic Front; however, Farouq was not a member of this grouping.

== Ideology and funding ==
Most fighters from the group were religious and conservative Sunni Muslims who used religious rhetoric and Sunni Islamist discourse. Jeffrey White, a former U.S. defense intelligence officer with the Washington Institute for Near East Policy and Joseph Holliday, a research analyst with the Institute for the Study of War "consider the Farouq Brigade "moderately Islamist" – that is, neither secular nor Salafi". White also indicated that the perception of their religiosity could be a way to gain money and weapons from Gulf donors, ultimately noting that “no one knows for sure” whether it is genuine.

Farouq has their own public relations wing which film their battlefield operations and upload them to YouTube and Facebook with their groups logo. These clips are used for fundraising from Syrians, donors in Gulf states, Western sources and Islamist groups.

== Controversies ==
In April 2012, the Farouq Brigades was accused of collecting jizyah, or taxes imposed on non-Muslims living under Muslim rule, in Christian areas of Homs province. However, the group denied this and the Institute for the Study of War said that "the accusation is likely from the Assad regime". There were also reports that the group had expelled 90% of the Christian population of Homs City. However, Jesuits in Homs disputed the cause of the exodus, and said that Christians were not targeted specifically, but fled the city on their own initiative because of the ongoing conflict. According to interviews made by McClatchy Newspapers of refugees in Lebanon, there was no targeting of Christians because of their religion. Rather, a number of government-affiliated Christians were seized by the Farouq Brigades, which led to some Christians fleeing the area.

In August 2012, Lieutenant Abdul Razzaq Tlass, one of the Farouq Brigades top leaders, was implicated in a sex scandal when video was posted to YouTube appearing to show him having cybersex with a woman through Skype. Tlass and others claimed the video was a fabrication by the Syrian Government. Nevertheless, by October 2012, Tlass was replaced as commander by Abu Sayeh Juneidi.

In September 2012, the northern branch of the Farouq Brigades was accused of kidnapping and killing Abu Mohamad al-Absi, a Syrian Jihadist who led a group of foreign fighters. The local Farouq Brigades leader said the foreign fighters had ignored their demands to leave the Bab al-Hawa border post. He said that al-Absi had "raised the al-Qaeda flag, and al-Qaeda is not welcomed by us".

In May 2013, a video was posted on the internet showing rebel commander Abu Sakkar cutting organs from the dead body of a Syrian soldier and putting one of them in his mouth, "as if he is taking a bite out of it". He called rebels to follow his example and terrorize the Alawite sect, which mostly backs Assad. Peter Bouckaert of Human Rights Watch confirmed the authenticity of the footage, and stated that "The mutilation of the bodies of enemies is a war crime. But the even more serious issue is the very rapid descent into sectarian rhetoric and violence". According to the BBC, Abu Sakkar appears to be a commander of the "Independent Omar al-Farouq Brigade". The BBC called the group an offshoot or sub-unit of the Farouq Brigades, saying that "the Farouq Brigade appears to be actually a complex of sub-units with a tangled pedigree". Human Rights Watch said "It is not known whether the Independent Omar al-Farouq Brigade operates within the command structure of the Free Syrian Army". The Syrian National Coalition said that the commander would be put on trial. The rebel Supreme Military Council called for Abu Sakkar's arrest, saying it wants him "dead or alive". Abu Sakkar said that the mutilation was revenge. He claimed he found a video on the soldier's cellphone in which the soldier sexually abuses a woman and her two daughters, along with other videos showing Assad loyalists raping, torturing, dismembering and killing people, including children. He further stated that if the war was to continue, "all Syrian people" would be like him. He was killed in northwest Latakia province on 6 April 2016 by the Syrian Army, while being affiliated to the al-Qaeda linked Al-Nusra Front.

In November 2016 in Tyrol, Austria, a former fighter of the Farouq Brigades was prosecuted for the summary execution of 20 wounded Syrian Army soldiers while in Homs between 2013 and 2014. In May 2017, he was found guilty and was sentenced to life imprisonment in Austria.

== Decline ==
By November 2013, the Farouq Brigades was reported as having suffered a serious decline in strength and area of influence, with it having splintered into numerous smaller factions, such as the Independent Omar al-Farouq Brigade and the Islamic al-Farouq Brigades. The group's presence outside Homs was said to have declined after losing feuds with more hardline Islamist rebel groups, like Ahrar ash-Sham and Jabhat al-Nusra, resulting in Farouq being expelled from the Raqqa Governorate and losing control of the strategic border crossing at Tal Abyad. By 2014, the rebel Hazzm Movement contained several groups that were formerly part of the Farouq Brigades.

After 2015, the remnants of the Farouq Brigades only officially operated around the town of Binnish, in the Idlib District of the Idlib Governorate. On 1 February 2017, they joined Ahrar al-Sham. In northern Hama, other remnants under the banner of the Farouq Brigade joined Tahrir al-Sham on 20 March 2017.

== See also ==
- List of armed groups in the Syrian Civil War
