= 2012 Homs offensive =

Military campaign in Homs, Syria

- Part of the Siege of Homs and the Early insurgency phase of the Syrian Civil War
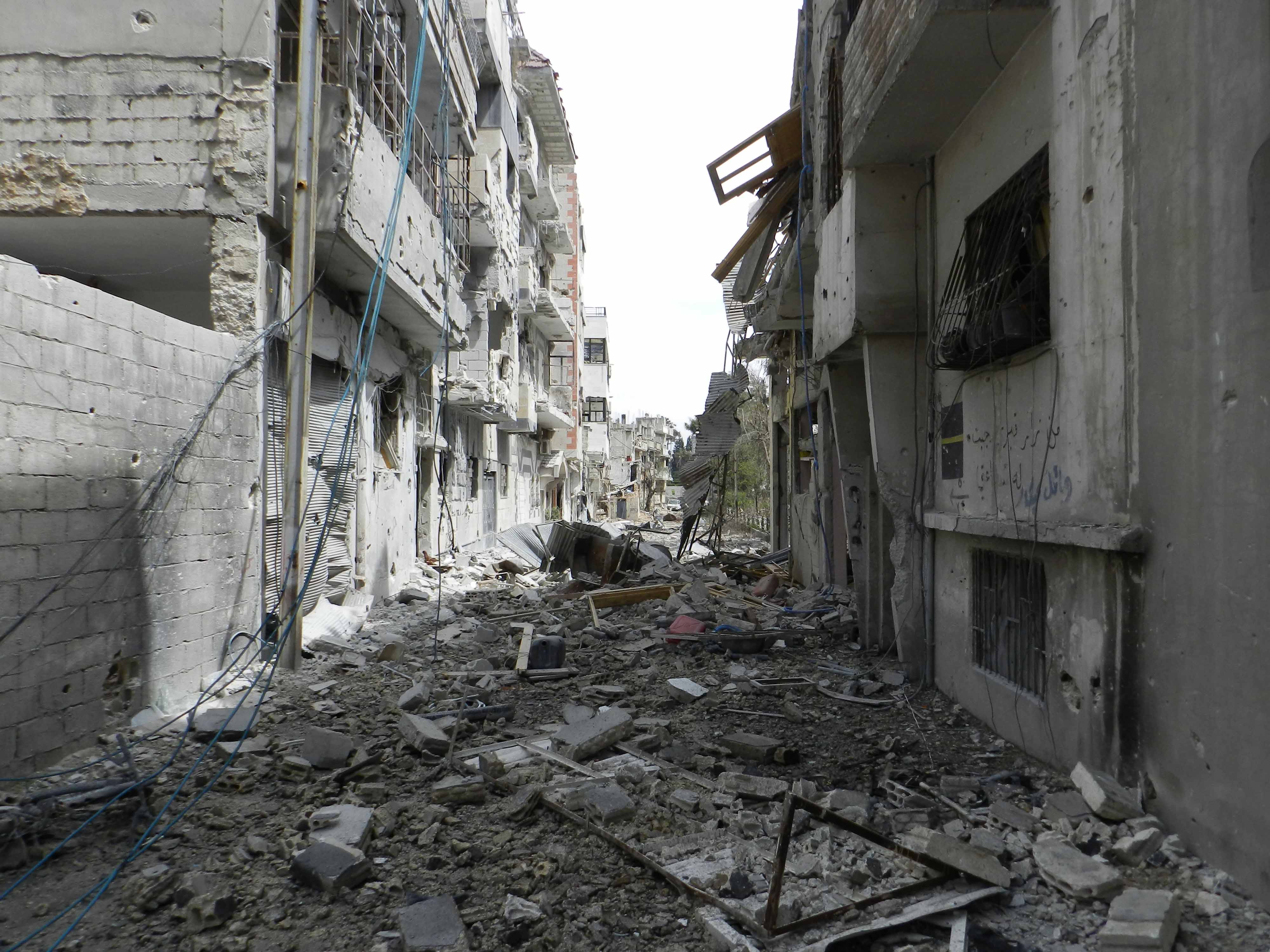
- Neighbourhoods in Homs under artillery bombardment (8 February 2012).
Date	3 February – 14 April 2012 (2 months, 1 week and 4 days)
Location	Homs, Syria 34°43′51″N 36°42′34″E
Result	Syrian government victory
Territorial changes	By March 2012, the Syrian security forces retake control of half a dozen districts, leaving them in control of 70 percent of the city

Belligerents
(Syrian opposition) Syrian Opposition	(Syria) Syrian Government; Hezbollah; Supported by: Iran

Commanders and leaders
(Syrian opposition) Lt. Abdul Razzaq Tlass (Syrian opposition) Col. Ahmed Jumrek †	Gen. Fo’ad Hamoudeh; Gen.Ghassan Afif; Gen. Mohamed Maaruf

Units involved
(Syrian opposition) Free Syrian Army; Farouq Brigades; Khalid ibn al-Walid Brigade; Saddam Hussein Martyrs Brigade; (Syrian opposition) Opposition protesters	Syrian Armed Forces; Syrian Army; 4th Armoured Division; 154th Army Regiment; 1st Division; 46th Armoured Brigade; 42nd Mechanised Brigade; Syrian Air Force; Security Agencies; Shabiha

Strength
(Syrian opposition) 1,000 fighters	7,000 soldiers

Casualties and losses
(Syrian opposition) 140–200 fighters killed (opposition claim) (Syrian opposition) Tens of fighters killed (Syrian opposition) 40 fighters captured (government claim)	38 soldiers killed 19 soldiers captured
- 700–1,000 civilians and rebels killed overall (per H.R.W. and the opposition, see Deaths below for other estimates)
- Note: Numbers of dead are only for the period up to the fall of the Baba Amr district

The 2012 Homs offensive was a Syrian Army offensive in early February 2012 on the armed rebellion stronghold of Homs. The offensive occurred within the scope of the Siege of Homs and ended with an U.N. brokered ceasefire on 14 April 2012.

The offensive began by artillery bombardment by the Syrian armed forces in response to an attack by the Free Syrian Army on Syrian Army checkpoints on 3 February 2012, killing 10 soldiers. Government forces then began to bombard the city using tanks, helicopters, and artillery, rockets and mortars. The Syrian government has denied that the bombardment is indiscriminate and blamed "armed groups" for the civilian deaths, including the deaths of foreign journalists.

Heavy shelling continued on 29 February, as the Syrian armed forces launched a ground operation to restore control of the Baba Amr neighbourhood. The Syrian government announced that the army was being sent into the area and were "cleaning" it from rebel fighters, and that the operation would be over in a matter of hours. At this stage, water supplies, electricity and communications were entirely cut off in the Baba Amr district according to opposition activists. Heavy clashes continued throughout the day, as the Syrian Army's 4th Armoured Division sent in tanks and infantry. Baba Amr was finally secured by the Syrian army on the morning of 1 March, as rebel forces claimed they had made a "tactical retreat" from the area, after running low on weapons and ammunition.

== Background ==
Following the killing of 10 Syrian Army soldiers at a checkpoint and the capture of another 19 soldiers by the Free Syrian Army, government forces began an artillery bombardment of the city of Homs on the night of 3 February 2012.

== The operation ==
=== February bombardment ===
The bombardment began on the 30th anniversary of the Hama Massacre, a significant event for many Syrians. The Khaldiyeh neighborhood in particular was targeted when the bombardment began on 3 February, and opposition activists soon claimed that the initial attack led to over 200 deaths. According to the opposition activist group Syrian Observatory for Human Rights, after more than two hours of shelling, at least 217 were killed in Homs, with 138 of the deaths having occurred in Khaldiya. They later raised their estimate of the death toll to over 260.

Within a few days, the opposition Syrian National Council claimed the death toll had reached 416, and cited residents as saying at least 36 houses with families still inside were totally destroyed. They later revised their toll down to 290 killed in that period, however. According to an Al Arabiya correspondent in Homs, the district hospital was also destroyed. The correspondent claimed that at least 337 people had been killed and that over 1,300 people were injured in the shelling. However, the SNC and Al Arabiya figures were not independently confirmed and several western media outlets (including Reuters, France24, BBC and CNN) reported the death toll at around 200. The Free Syrian Army vowed to fight back with intense operations against the governments' forces and claimed to have destroyed an air intelligence building in Homs. Opposition activists posted many videos depicting burning buildings and dead bodies that they said were filmed in Homs. At least 30 buildings, including a hospital, were said to have been destroyed or severely damaged in the shelling. According to the SOHR, 14 Syrian Army soldiers and five army defectors were also killed in the shelling and fighting in addition to the civilian deaths. The Local Coordination Committees also initially claimed that the death toll was more than 200 people, saying that they were working to confirm the number of deaths. They later revised their figures, confirming only 55 deaths. On 5 February, the LCC stated that they had documented the names of 212 people that had been killed in Homs, but counted only 181 bodies.

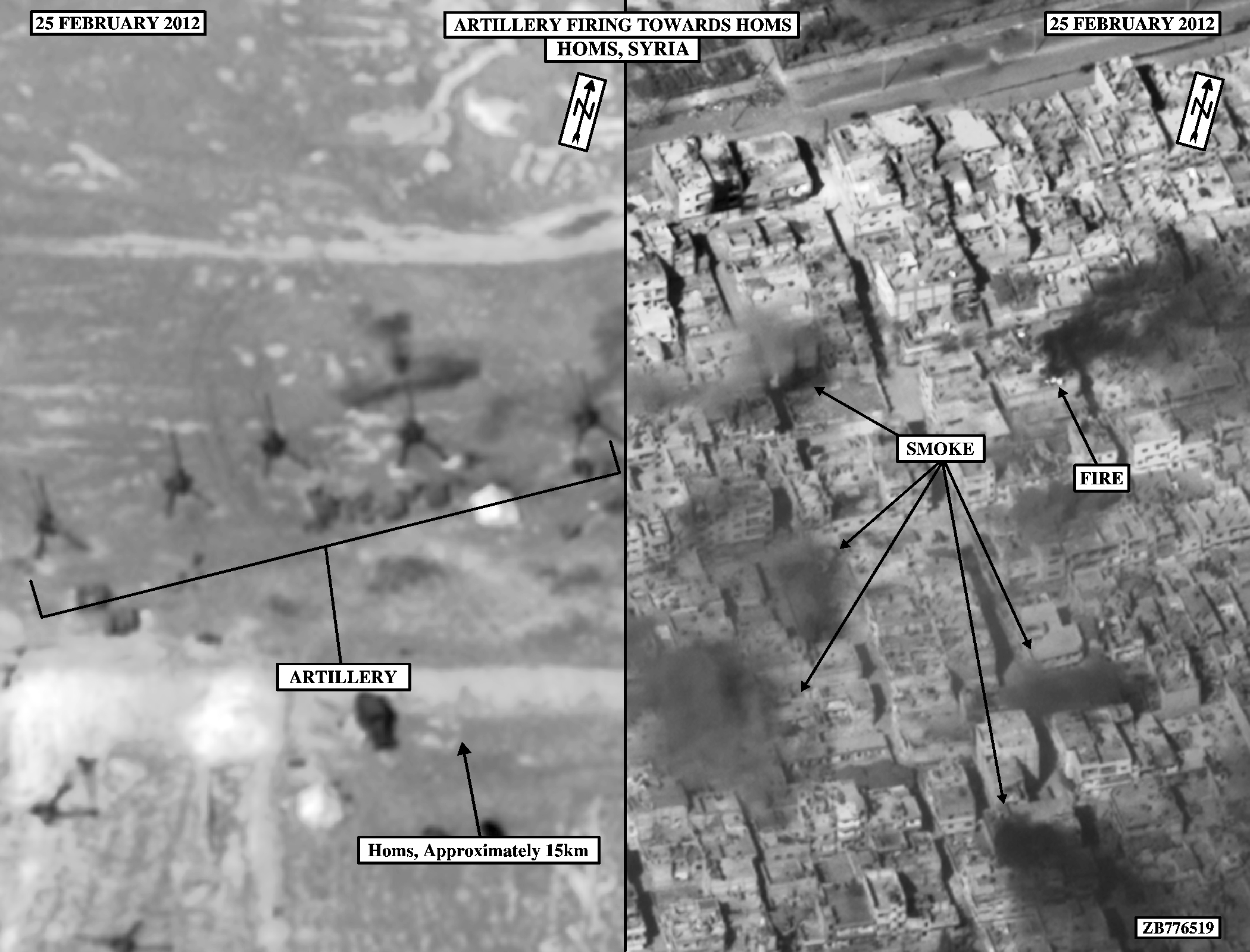
Artillery firing towards Homs, Syria. Smoke rising from the subsequent shelled buildings, 25 February.

At least 300 rockets struck Homs on the morning of 6 February, leading to 15 deaths, with some claiming up to 50 dead, and later 95 dead. The FSA attempted a counter-attack against the government forces, managing to hold them at bay for a short time before they had to fall back. Two rebel fighters were killed in the fighting. The assault continued on 7 February, resulting in at least 19 deaths and 40 injuries as government forces shelled the city and attempted to move into rebel-held areas.

At least 47 people were killed on the morning of 8 February. Tanks were reported moving down the main thoroughfares and were poised to advance into residential areas, according to locals. The Syrian state news agency reported that an oil refinery near Homs was attacked by "armed groups." On 9 February, activists said 110 people were killed in Homs by artillery shelling. Another group of activists reported a toll of 57 dead. On 10 February, five FSA fighters were killed in the continued shelling, including Colonel Ahmed Jumrek, who had defected from the Syrian Army.

On 14 February, an FSA commander told reporters that his men had repelled a ground assault on the Bab Amr district, saying that four government tanks had been destroyed when they tried to enter the district.

According to the opposition, rockets struck parts of Homs at a rate of four per minute on 18 February, the most violent bombardment for two weeks. The BBC reported shells were hitting the Homs neighborhoods of Baba Amr, Inshaat, Bayada and Khaldiya, according to opposition and human rights activists. On the morning of 21 February 2012, news sources were reporting a new wave of heavy bombardment had begun, killing at least 30 people. An opposition member who was broadcasting live footage of the quarter of Bab Amr on the website Bambuser was killed in the fighting.

American journalist Marie Colvin, working for The Sunday Times of London, was killed in Homs on 22 February during an artillery attack, along with French photographer Rémi Ochlik. In her last broadcast, an interview with Anderson Cooper of CNN, Colvin accused the Syrian Army of perpetrating the "complete and utter lie that they are only targeting terrorists." Describing what was happening as "absolutely sickening", Colvin said: "The Syrian army is simply shelling a city of cold, starving civilians." Colvin, who had lost an eye to shrapnel in Sri Lanka and had covered conflicts in Chechnya, Kosovo, Sierra Leone, Zimbabwe, Libya, and East Timor, described the bombardment of Homs as the worst conflict she had ever experienced.

Soon after Colvin's death, Lebanese intelligence claimed to have intercepted communications between Syrian Army officers to the effect that direct orders had been issued to target the makeshift press centre from which Colvin had been broadcasting. Jean-Pierre Perrin, a journalist for the Paris-based Liberation newspaper who had been with Colvin in Homs as recently as the previous week, claimed he had been told that the Syrian Army was "deliberately" going to shell their centre. Mr Perrin said the Syrians were "fully aware" that the press centre was broadcasting direct evidence of crimes against humanity, including the murdering of women and children. Perrin claimed that "[t]he Syrian Army issued orders to 'kill any journalist that set foot on Syrian soil,'" saying that he received news of the intercepted Syrian Army radio traffic upon arriving in Beirut. The Syrian government knew that if they destroyed the press centre, said Mr. Perrin, there would be "no more information coming out of Homs."

Activists told that 81 people, both FSA rebels and civilians, were killed the same day. One activist told that helicopters were used to identify the targets. A Lebanese official told that the Syrian government wanted to finish the battle before the referendum poll on the new Syrian constitution. On the same day, Syrian state media claimed men had killed two officers, a first lieutenant and a captain, when men fired an RPG at their car from a bridge. SANA said another member of the security forces was killed by a bomb in Homs.

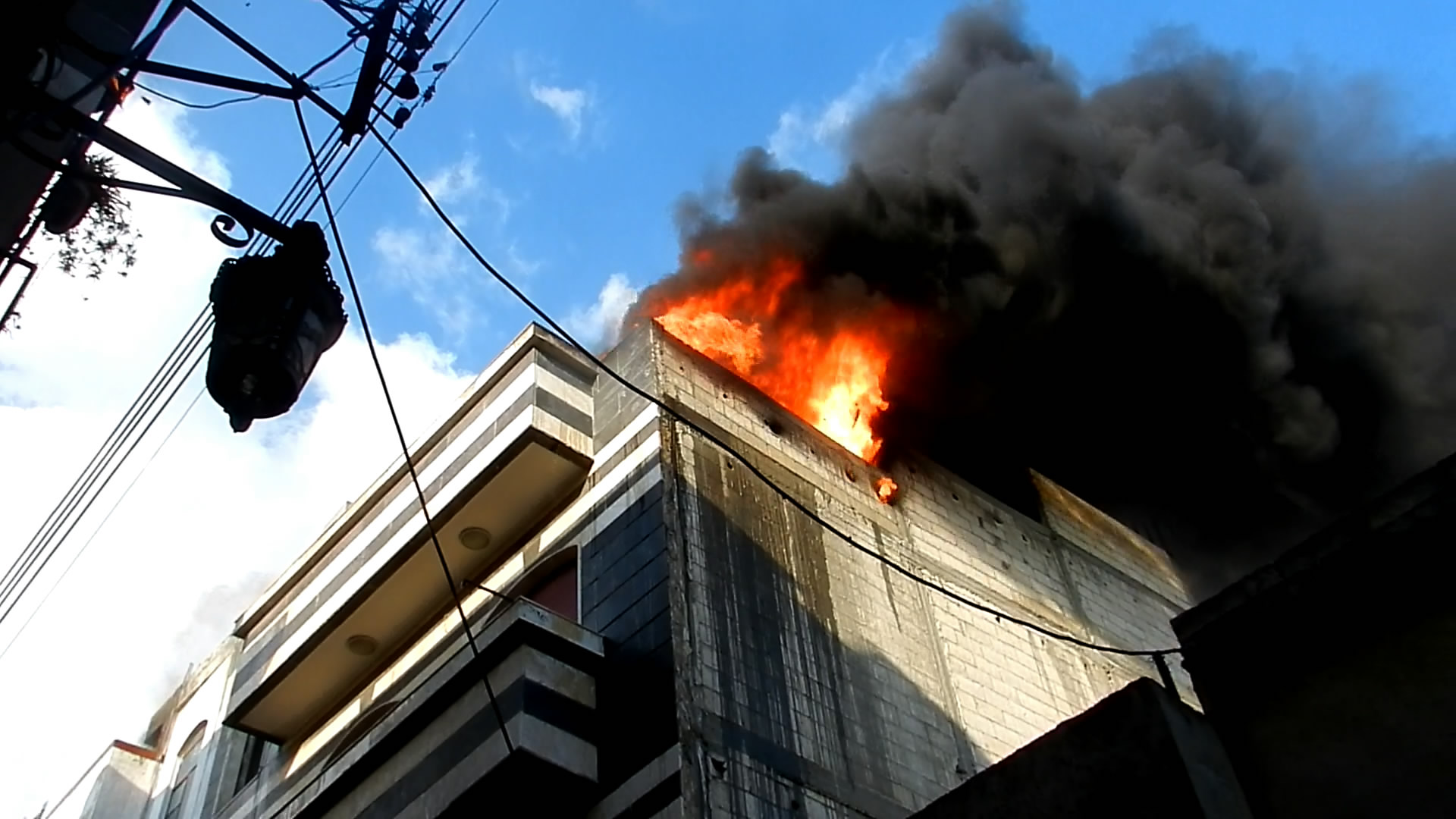
Building burning in "Bab Dreeb" after shelling by the Syrian Army.

On 23 February, the Syrian army entered the Jobar area close to Bab Amr. One activist told that the army successfully cut all escape roads of Bab Amr and that unlike the previous fights, the FSA will be unable to escape.

On 26 February, SANA reported that 40 rebels surrendered in Bab Amr quarter. At least 89 people died in Homs between 26 and 27 February as clashes and bombardment continued. 64 of those killed were refugees kidnapped and executed by the Syrian Army, according to opposition sources. At least 25 people were wounded in shelling on 27 February.

=== Government ground assault on Baba Amr ===
Heavy shelling continued on 29 February as government forces launched an operation to retake control of the Baba Amr neighbourhood. The Syrian government announced that the army was being sent into the area and were "cleaning" it from rebel fighters, and that the operation would be over in a matter of hours. Helicopter gunships were reported to have fired upon FSA fighters and civilians, according to people on the ground. At least 11 people were reported killed initially, including a family of five. Water supplies, electricity and communications were entirely cut off in the Baba Amr district according to opposition activists. Heavy clashes continued throughout the day, as the Syrian Army's 4th Armoured Division sent in tanks and infantry. Although the FSA Farouq Brigades defending Baba Amr stated that they would fight to the last man, it was reported that some of the FSA leaders already made an escape from the district.

Baba Amr finally fell to government forces on the morning of 1 March, as the Free Syrian Army claimed they had made a "tactical retreat" from the area, after running low on weapons and ammunition. They made the decision to withdraw from Baba Amr and into other parts of Homs because "worsening humanitarian conditions, lack of food and medicine and water, electricity and communication cuts as well as shortages in weapons." During their retreat, 17 rebels were captured by the military and executed on the spot. The activist group Avaaz, for its part, claimed they were civilians and that they were beheaded, but this was not confirmed by other sources. Afterwards, at least 10 Syrian civilians were killed by government forces, who had also turned the shopping centre into a detention area. At a later date, an FSA commander stated that out of 250 rebel fighters defending the district 114 were killed in the fighting.

=== Karm al-Zeitoun massacre ===
On 9 March, 30 tanks of the Syrian Army entered the quarter of Karm al-Zeitoun. After this, it was reported that the Syrian Army had massacred 47 women and children in the district (26 children and 21 women), some of whom had their throats slit, according to activists. The opposition claimed that the main perpetrators behind the killings were the government paramilitary force the Shabiha. The Syrian National Council (SNC), the main opposition group, called for an emergency UN Security Council meeting to discuss the "massacre", which it said took place on 11 March. Hadi Abdallah, a Syrian activist, said: "Some of the children had been hit with blunt objects on their head, one little girl was mutilated and some women were raped before being killed," he said. Video footage was made of the bodies. The Syrian Government acknowledged that the massacre had indeed taken place, but claimed that "armed gangs" in the district killed them. On 13 March, opposition activists posted a video on the internet purporting to show the army shelling the district of Karm al-Zeitoun.

=== March–April fighting ===
On 20 March, 14 were reported killed from a new round of shelling, which continued into the next day, hitting the opposition stronghold neighborhoods of Khalidiya, Qussor, and Bayada in northern Homs. The military also reportedly entered Khalidiya. The opposition activist group, the L.C.C., stated that another 40 people were killed on the second day of the bombardment, including 25 in Khalidiya.

On 24 March, most rebel forces retreated from the Bab Sbaa district, under intense shelling, as the military moved in and a number of civilians were also attempting to leave the neighborhood. However, activists reported the neighbourhood was still under bombardment of heavy shelling as of 26 March. Still, an activist stated that the FSA presence in the district was small and they were not in a position to do anything. Another activist also later confirmed the capture of the district.

On 2 April, about 40 FSA members captured the National Hospital in Juret al-Shayah district. They found 78 corpses stacked in a refrigerator.

In renewed fighting on 8 April, mortars were described as falling "like rain" on the opposition-held neighbourhood of Khaldiyeh, according to an activist. A makeshift hospital was allegedly stacked with 40 bodies which the opposition were desperately trying to keep cool with fans. According to the activist, they may have to be buried "in public gardens" due to a lack of other feasible options.

=== Mid-April ===
Starting on 14 April 2012, a nationwide cease-fire came in effect, though separate clashes continued in several friction points. Into the morning of the same day, major shelling happened in the districts of Juret al-Shayah and al-Qarabis that violated the implemented Kofi Annan truce.

The following day, the Syrian Army was reportedly shelling the neighborhood of al-Waer from the nearby military academy. SANA also reported that terrorists killed 12 civilians in the Alawite, pro-government, neighborhood of al-Zahra in what seemed like an FSA attack on the neighborhood.

On 16 April, heavy shelling was coming from three sides into al-Khalidiya. The government also stormed al-Bayada and took control of half of it. They were also trying to storm Juret al-Shayah and al-Qarabis, but were being repelled by the FSA.

== Aftermath (summer 2013) ==
On 27 July 2013, the Syrian Army took control of the Khalid Ibn Al-Walid Mosque located in Khalidyeh, one of the two last rebel stronghold in Homs. The quarter of Khalidyeh was now in the hand of the government forces at 60%.

After the Battle of al-Qusayr (2013), the government launched an offensive against Homs. By the end of July it was reported that at least most of Homs was in government hands. Though state television said that the government was in control of the strategic enclave, some opposition fighters said they were still fighting from pockets of the city. One unnamed FSA Islamist brigade showed videos of its fighters without ammunition but strapped with suicide vests as their only remaining weapons. Other sources indicated that it was a matter of time that the government took control of the city if already had not done so.

== Deaths ==
The number of deaths during the artillery strikes and subsequent clashes has varied widely, with the lowest estimate for the first day of the bombardment being 181, while the highest was 416, which was later revised down.

While opposition sources have claimed that most of those killed were civilians, government sources stated that out of the 500 reportedly killed by 13 February, most were either insurgents or government troops.

Journalist Marie Colvin in her last report before her death, said that due to the lack of identified military targets, many civilian buildings were damaged. According to her report, the casualties she had seen were about 80% civilians and the rest were FSA fighters.

=== Day-by-day ===
Note: No precise casualty counts have been confirmed by any independent agencies

Source	Casualties	Day
L.C.C.	181–212	3/4 February
S.N.C.	260	3/4 February
Locals	290	3/4 February
Al Arabiya	337	3/4 February
S.O.H.R.	48	3/4 February
L.C.C.	29	5 February
Various	42–95	6 February
L.C.C.	19	7 February
Various	53–67 killed	8 February
Various	57–110	9 February
L.C.C.	16	10 February
Various	7–31	11 February
Various	23	12 February
Various	3–11	13 February
Various	6–9	14 February
L.C.C.	4	15 February
L.C.C.	4	16 February
L.C.C.	17	17 February
L.C.C.	5	18 February
L.C.C.	10	19 February
Various	9–13	20 February
Various	45–49	21 February
L.C.C.	30	22 February
L.C.C.	4	23 February
L.C.C.	32	24 February
L.C.C.	36	25 February
L.C.C.	23	26 February
Various	64–104	27 February
L.C.C.	50	28 February
L.C.C.	16	29 February
L.C.C.	22	1 March

=== Total ===
Source	Casualties	Period
Various	321	3–5 February
S.O.H.R.	400	3–8 February
AI	246	3–8 February
Sawasiah	300	3–8 February
H.R.C.	559	3–10 February
L.C.C.	427	3–11 February
Various	500–754	3–13 February
Various	700–1,000	3 February – 1 March

== Reactions to 2012 incident ==
Government

The Syrian Interior Ministry stated that in criminal groups escalated their aggressions and criminal acts "perpetrating heinous crimes that claimed the lives of hundreds of civilians, booby-trapping private buildings, kidnapping and looting private and public properties". A statement by the Ministry explained that "the competent authorities practiced the utmost self-restraint and gave terrorists a number of opportunities to return to the road of right.. but they refused and escalated their terror instigated by foreign sides.. all of this pushed the authorities to intervene and deal with them to restore security and stability to Homs".

Opposition

Abu Rami Alhomsy of the Syrian Revolutionary General Commission claimed the shelling in lasted more than three hours. "It was a normal day for a demonstration but last night they started shelling this neighbourhood. We have many injuries. Many women and children have been killed and injured. I am hiding in the street with many people around me. They are shooting into here from an outside area." The Syrian government denied that the shelling occurred and that it was a fabrication by opposition groups to try to influence a UNSC resolution that sought to condemn the Syrian government the same day. It also accused the armed groups in Homs of killing soldiers and civilians.

International

Many news sources, and the governments of Turkey and France, have described the attack as a "massacre". In response, protesters attacked Syrian embassies in a number of cities worldwide. The United Nations Security Council voted on an Arab League proposal to resolve problems in Syria following these events. China and Russia vetoed the resolution. EU High Representative for Foreign Policy Catherine Ashton has stated: "I am appalled by the reports of the brutal attacks by the Syrian armed forces in Homs. I condemn in the strongest terms these acts perpetrated by the Syrian regime against its own civilians The international community must speak with one voice, demanding an end to the bloodshed and urging Assad to step aside and allow a democratic transition."

The UN chief, Ban Ki-moon, says he has received "grisly reports" that Syrian government forces are arbitrarily executing, imprisoning and torturing people in Homs after opposition fighters in the city retreated.

"A major assault on Homs took place yesterday," Ban told the UN General Assembly in New York on 2 March. "Civilian losses have clearly been heavy. We continue to receive grisly reports of summary executions, arbitrary detentions and torture. This atrocious assault is all the more appalling for having been waged by the government itself, systematically attacking its own people". Activists said that government forces were rounding up people aged between 14-50 and executing them in batches. UN rights chief Navi Pillay called for urgent international action to protect civilians in Syria:

I am appalled by the Syrian government's wilful assault on Homs, and its use of artillery and other heavy weaponry in what appear to be indiscriminate attacks on civilian areas in the city. The failure of the Security Council to agree on firm collective action appears to have fuelled the Syrian government's readiness to massacre its own people in an effort to crush dissent."

Tunisia said it would expel the Syrian ambassador in response to what it called a "bloody massacre" and announced it no longer recognises the ruling government.

Saudi Arabia, Qatar, Kuwait, Bahrain, Oman and the UAE agreed to withdraw their ambassadors from Damascus, and expel the Syrian ambassadors to their respective countries, in protest at the Syrian governments crackdown, particularly in Homs. Germany, Spain, Belgium and France also announced the withdrawal of ambassadors from Syria. The Netherlands also recalled its ambassador. The United Kingdom followed these countries and also recalled their ambassador.

In Libya, protesters took over the Syrian embassy and the official National Transitional Council handed control of the embassy to the opposition or "revolutionaries". Syrians residing in Libya protested outside the country's Russian embassy in Tripoli, eventually hoisting a Syrian opposition flag. Libyans and Syrians also rallied outside the Chinese embassy in Libya, "to denounce China’s decision to veto a UN resolution that would seek to end the violence and bloodshed in Syria." Libya also expelled the ambassador for the al-Assad government; the ambassador's car was attacked by unarmed Syrian protesters as he fled Tripoli.

This came after the prime minister of the United Kingdom David Cameron accused the government of butchering its own people. This is while 10 civilians were said to have been executed outside a shop in Bab Amr. Speaking in Brussels, he said:

"The Assad regime is butchering its own people. The history of Homs is being written in the blood of its citizens."
"The situation in Syria is absolutely appalling and it is vitally important that there is humanitarian access into Homs and elsewhere so that people can get the help they need."
"But above all, what I think matters, is building the evidence and the picture so we hold this criminal regime to account and make sure that it is held to account for the crimes it is committing against its people and that one day, no matter how long it takes, there will be a day of reckoning for this dreadful regime."

The French President (at the time) Nicolas Sarkozy accused Syrian President Bashar al-Assad of seeking to "wipe Homs from the map", comparing his campaign to the Libyan government's attacks on the city of Benghazi. "Bashar al-Assad is lying in a shameful way, he wants to wipe Homs from the map like (former Libyan leader Muammar) Gaddafi wanted to wipe Benghazi from the map," Sarkozy said. Foreign Minister Alain Juppe said that the government had "broken all the limits of barbarism. And when I see the Syrian president paraded around this voting station in Damascus for this phony referendum, it makes you deeply indignant." Juppe said he felt "immensely frustrated" at difficulties in obtaining security guarantees to enable wounded civilians and Western journalists to be evacuated from Homs.

In other countries, Syrian expatriates protested against the attack. Syrian embassies in Egypt and Germany were attacked, with protesters setting fire to part of the embassy and at least 30 people storming the premises, respectively. There was more than 150 protesters chanting outside the London embassy at 3:00. Around 50 mostly Syrian protesters broke into their country's embassy in Greece on that morning, smashing windows and painting anti-government slogans on the walls, a police source told the AFP. Twelve Syrians and an Iraqi were arrested afterwards. In Kuwait, witnesses said demonstrators stormed the Syrian embassy compound breaking windows and hoisting the flag of the opposition. The Syrian Embassy in Australia was also damaged and ransacked. There were also protests outside the Syrian embassy in the United States.

== See also ==
- Battle of Rastan (2011)
- Battle of Idlib (2012)
- Battle of Taftanaz
