= Ayn al-Habis =

Medieval fortress in Jordan

Coordinates: 32°43′11″N 35°50′14″E

Ayn al-Habis (Arabic: عين الحبيس), also known by its medieval names Cave de Sueth (Old French, French: Cave de Suète), Cava de Suet (Medieval Latin), or Habis Jaldak (Classical Arabic), is a 12th century cave castle built into the southern cliffs of the Yarmouk River gorge in modern-day Jordan. It was located at the edge of the Terre de Suète region (al-Sawad, "the black" in Arabic).

== History ==
The fortress was established by 1109 among the ruins of a Byzantine monastic laura. Hugh Kennedy accepts Ibn al-Qalanisi's description of the destruction by Toghtekin, atabeg of Damascus, of the Castle of al-Al in the western Golan Heights in 1105, whose remains are yet to be identified, and presents the Crusader presence at the Cave de Sueth as the "more circumspect" position adopted after the loss of that advanced outpost. In 1109, a truce was declared between Baldwin I and Toghtekin, and the surrounding area, Terre de Suète, was supposed to be ruled as a condominium by Jerusalem and Damascus. Nevertheless, the castle was attacked by Toghtekin in 1111, killing its Frankish garrison, but was retaken by the Franks two years later. The Muslims captured the castle in 1118 only to lose it in the campaign of Baldwin II that resulted in capture of the entire Yarmouk valley. Nur ad-Din besieged Cave de Sueth in 1158, but retreated with the approach of Baldwin III. In 1182 the castle was captured by Farrukh Shah, the nephew of Saladin, only to return to Frankish control later that year, where it remained until shortly before the conquests of Saladin in 1187.

== Bibliography ==
- Baldwin, Marshall W.; Setton, Kenneth M., eds. (1969). A History of the Crusades: Volume One, The First Hundred Years. Madison: The University of Wisconsin Press. pp. 522, 542. ISBN 9780299048341. Also at Wisconsin U. Library.
- Devais, Cédric (2013). "The Frankish Conquest: a Century of Rupture (1099-1189)". In Myriam Ababsa (ed.). Atlas of Jordan. Contemporain publications. Presses de l’Ifpo. pp. 180–183. ISBN 9782351594384.
- Devais, Cèdric (2010). "A Seigneury on the Eastern Border of the Kingdom of Jerusalem: The Terre de Suète". In James Schryver (ed.). Studies in the Archaeology of the Medieval Mediterranean. BRILL. pp. 71–92. ISBN 9789004181755.
- Kennedy, Hugh (2001). Crusader Castles. Cambridge University Press, pp. 40, 52-53.
- Murray, Alan V., ed. (2006). The Crusades: An Encyclopedia (4-volume set). Santa Barbara: ABC-CLIO. ISBN 9781576078624.
  - Pringle, Denys (2006). Cave de Suète. p. 233.
  - Murray, Alan V. (2006). Terre de Suète. pp. 1157–1158.
- Nicolle, David (1988). "Ain al-Habis: The Cave de Sueth". Archéologie médiévale 18, pp. 113-140. Full article online at persee.fr, with plans, photos, and William of Tyre's description of the second siege of 1182.
- Pringle, Denys (1997). "'Ain al-Habis (No. 10)". Secular Buildings in the Crusader Kingdom of Jerusalem: An Archaeological Gazetteer. Cambridge University Press. p. 18. ISBN 9780521460101. Oct 2021: page not accessible on Google Books.
- Runciman, Steven (1952). A History of the Crusades. Vol. 2: The Kingdom of Jerusalem and the Frankish East, 1100–1187. London: Cambridge University Press. pp. 95–96. Oct 2021: no access via Google Books.
- "Ain al-Habis, Cave de Sueth, Habis Jaldak". burgenring.de. burgenwelt.org.
