= Qassem Saadeddine =

Former Commander in the Free Syrian Army

- قاسم سعد الدين

Personal details
- Born: 18 February 1965 (age 61) Al-Rastan, Homs, Syria
- Children: 6

Military service
- Allegiance: Syrian Armed Forces (until 2012) (Syrian opposition) Free Syrian Army (2012–unknown)
- Branch/service: Syrian Air Force (until 2012)
- Rank: Colonel (in the Syrian Armed Forces)
- Battles/wars: Syrian civil war; Battle of Rastan (May 2012)

Qassem Saadeddine (Arabic: قاسم سعد الدين) is a Syrian former military officer and pilot and a prominent figure in the Syrian civil war.

A former colonel in the Syrian Air Force, he defected from the Ba'athist Syrian government forces in February 2012 and became a key leader within the Free Syrian Army. He was the commander of the Military Council in Homs and played a role in organizing opposition forces in the region.

== Early life and education ==
Saadeddine was born on 18 February 1965 in Al-Rastan, a city in the Homs Governorate of Syria. He completed his secondary education in Al-Rastan before enrolling in the Syrian Air Force Academy in 1985. He graduated in 1988 with the rank of lieutenant pilot.

Throughout his career in the Syrian military, Saadeddine participated in several advanced training programs, including:

- Leader of a flight pair
- Leader of a squadron
- Command courses
- Computer courses
- Navigation training

He trained on various aircraft models, such as the Flamingo, L-39, MiG-21, and MiG-23BN.

== Defection and role in the Free Syrian Army ==
Saadeddine defected from the Syrian Armed Forces on 3 February 2012. At the time, he was serving with the 20th Air Division, 17th Air Defense Brigade, 697th MiG-23 Squadron. His defection occurred during the early stages of the Syrian civil war, and he announced his support for the Syrian revolution and joining its forces.

Following his defection, Saadeddine was involved in organizing and leading opposition forces. He helped establish several military formations, including "Liwa Rijal Allah" (Men of God Brigade) in Al-Rastan in February 2012. On 29 March 2012, he co-founded the Joint Command of the Free Syrian Army inside Syria and became the commander of the Military Council in Homs.

== Military leadership ==
Saadeddine was a key participant in battles in northern Homs Governorate, particularly in Al-Rastan. He led operations that resulted in the temporary takeover of Al-Rastan and neighboring towns such as Talbiseh by opposition forces.

In early 2012, he commanded an operation to take over Al-Rastan, successfully repelling government forces and causing significant casualties. On 5 February 2012, the city was fully under opposition forces' control.

Despite facing repeated attacks, including the destruction of his home and the deaths of several family members, Saadeddine refused offers of financial incentives from the Ba'athist Syrian government to abandon the opposition. He reportedly rejected a $1 million bribe to leave Syria and denounce his defection.

== Public statements ==
Saadeddine has been a vocal critic of the Ba'athist Syrian government and its use of chemical weapons. In a 2013 interview with France 24, he condemned the Syrian government’s chemical attacks and held the international community accountable for failing to prevent such actions.

In a 2021 interview with the Syrian Observatory for Human Rights, he expressed support for a transitional military council to oversee Syria's post-conflict period, emphasizing the need for democratic reforms and justice for victims of the war.

== Personal life ==
Saadeddine is married and has six children.

He has survived multiple assassination attempts.

== See also ==
- Armed factions in the Syrian civil war
- Fall of the Assad regime
