= Baba Amr =

Baba Amr بابا عمرو
- Neighborhood
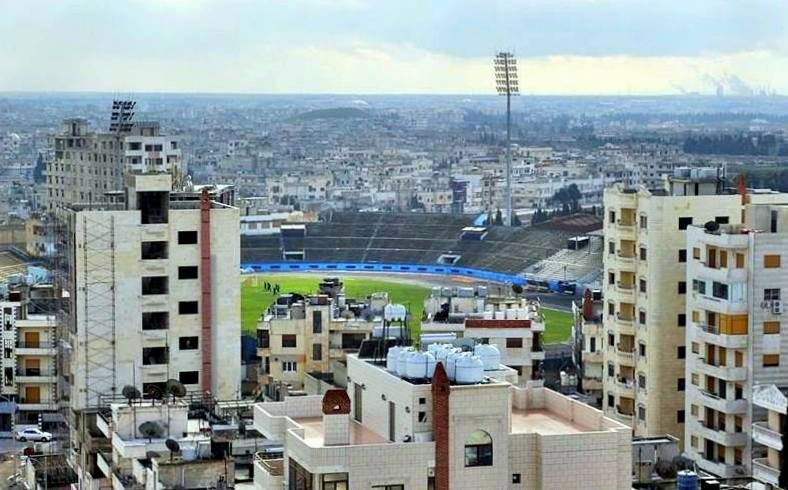
- View of Baba Amr neighbourhood

- Location in Syria
- Coordinates: 34°42′39″N 36°41′28″E
- Country: Syria
- Governorate: Homs
- Subdistrict: Homs
- City: Homs

Population (2004)
  - Total: 34,175
- Population includes adjacent neighborhood of Sultaniya

Baba Amr (Arabic: بابا عمرو/ALA-LC: Bâba ʿAmr) is a city district (hayy) in southwestern Homs in central Syria. In 2004, it had a population of 34,175 (the hayy of Sultaniya which abuts Baba Amr to the south was also counted in this figure). Abutting Baba Amr and Sultaniya from the north and south respectively are the city districts of Inshaat and the village of Jobar. To the west are the villages of Aysun, Shalluh and al-Mazra'a and to the east is Homs' Palestinian refugee camp.

== History ==
Baba Amr was named after Amr ibn Abasah, who was buried in Homs. In the early 20th century, Baba Amr was a village in Orontes plain southwest of Homs. The modern district was formed largely as a result of Bedouin migration from the desert steppe east of Homs to the city's suburbs in the 1960s and 1970s. The Bedouin moved to the area due to land reforms by the Ba'athist government of leaders Salah Jadid and Hafez al-Assad which saw many semi-nomadic Bedouin settle in the suburbs of major cities. Most of Baba Amr's inhabitants self-identify as members of the Mawali and Hassana tribal confederations. The inhabitants are predominantly Sunni Muslims.

During the Syrian Civil War, Baba Amr was the epicentre of fighting in the 2012 Homs offensive.
