= Saddam Hussein Martyrs Brigade =

Militant organization in Syria

- كتيبة شهداء صدام حسين
- Leaders: Hussam al-Shalouf (Al-Mayadin branch); Osama Muhammad Julaq (Al-Dar al-Kabirah branch)
- Dates active: 2012 — 2013
- Country: Syria
- Allegiance: Free Syrian Army
- Active regions: Al-Dar al-Kabirah, Al-Mayadin
- Ideology: Saddamism (Alleged)
- Wars: Syrian civil war; 2012–2013 escalation of the Syrian civil war; 2012 Homs offensive; Deir ez-Zor Governorate campaign; Deir ez-Zor clashes (2011–2014); Deir ez-Zor offensive (April–July 2014)
- Website: YouTube channel

Saddam Hussein Martyrs Brigade (Arabic: كتيبة شهداء صدام حسين) was a militant organization in Syria, named after Saddam Hussein, the Ba'athist president of Iraq.

== History ==
=== Foundation ===
The group announced their establishment in Idlib in September 18, 2012, stating that "the Syrian revolution rejects the usurpation of land and demands freedom".

=== Activities ===
It changed its name after offending Kurds to "We Are Coming, Sham" stating that they were using Saddam Hussein's name for their confrontation with Shiism

It had one of its headquarters in Al-Mayadin fighting in Deir ez-Zor clashes (2011–2014)

The group fought in Homs in 2012 Homs offensive

The group disappeared at the end of 2013 after the offensive of the Islamic State in Deir ez-Zor, against the Syrian opposition.

=== Financing ===
Kuwaiti sources have expressed outrage that it bears Saddam Hussein's name, because members of Kuwait's parliament had made donations that helped establish the group.
