= Terre de Suète =

Historical region near the Sea of Galilee

Terre de Suète (in modern French, most likely from the Arabic al-Sawad, "cultivated zone") spelled Terre de Sueth(e) in Old French, was the name applied by the Franks to a region east of the Sea of Galilee, referring to its dark basalt soil. The core of the region was the fertile, corn-producing area of the Hauran (as far as Deraa) and extended to the Golan Heights and beyond the river Yarmouk south to the Zarqa river, including Ajloun. The region was invaded by Tancred in 1100, and after intervention by Duqaq, the emir of Damascus, agreed to Frankish suzerainty. In the period 1105–1126, the Franks of Jerusalem made several unsuccessful efforts to wrest control of the region from Damascus.

During this time an accommodation was reached (which came to be repeatedly renewed by treaty up to the time of Saladin) recognizing the Terre de Suète as a condominium under the joint sovereignty of Damascus and the kingdom of Jerusalem. The treaty provided that each party took a third of the produce and revenues of Coele-Syria, with the remainder going to its inhabitants. The area north of the river Yarmouk remained largely demilitarized, with the Franks receiving the castles of al-Munaitirah and Ḥiṣn ibn ‘Akkār, and tribute from castles of Masyaf, Ḥiṣn al-Akrād and Ḥiṣn al-Tūfān.

For most of the twelfth century the Franks maintained an important strongpoint south of the river at the cave fortress of Cave de Sueth, replacing the presence sought by the castle of al-Al.
