= Castle of al-Al =

Crusader castle in the Golan Heights, not yet identified

The Castle of al-Al, also ʿAlʿāl (Arabic: قلعة العال, "Qal'at al-'Al") was, according to contemporary Damascene chronicler Ibn al-Qalanisi, a short-lived castle built in 1105 near al-‘Al on the Golan Heights by Hugh of Saint Omer, the man put in charge of the Galilee by King Baldwin I. The location is described as "between the Sawad and al-Bathaniya". Israeli historian Moshe Sharon considers it to be a mere legend rooted in a popular etymology, with no historical base.

Al-Qalanisi, a politician and historian from nearby Damascus, is the only contemporary chronicler of the castle's existence and history. H. A. R. Gibb, Qalanisi's first English translator, claims that the Damascene Chronicle is an accurate chronology of events. According to Sharon's 1997 theory, all medieval Muslim chronicles after al-Qalanisi are sourced on him and therefore do not prove the castle's existence.

The identification with the ruins at the site of Qasr Bardawil was abandoned after it being classified as a Bronze Age site.

== History ==
The history of the castle is based on the Continuation of the Chronicle of Damascus, the main work of contemporary Damascene politician and historian Ibn al-Qalanisi (c. 1071–1160), who writes that the Franks built the castle in 1105 and that Toghtekin, atabeg of Damascus, captured it, returning to Damascus with a huge amount of booty on December 24 of the same year. Qalanisi describes Toghtekin's motive as his fear that, once the allegedly impregnable castle was completed, it would be more difficult to "undo". He makes however no explicit mention of Toghtekin demolishing the castle.

Sibt ibn al-Jawzi (c. 1185–1256), author of Mirāt al-Zamān fī Tārīkh al-Ā‘yān ('Mirror of time in histories of the notables'), adds or modifies several of Qalanisi's details: Tughtegin's attack took place during the night, and his return to Damascus happened at a much later date, in February/March 1106. More such details come from al-Jawzi and another historian who used Qalanisi's chronicle as a source, Ibn al-Athir (1160-1233): the castle had a garrison of no less than 200 men, and Tughtegin destroyed the castle after assessing the position as too exposed to Frankish counter-attacks.

Moshe Sharon, in his monumental Corpus Inscriptionum Arabicarum Palaestinae (CIAP), states that there has been no such castle at all. He considers it to be a legend that must have begun with someone identifying the Arabic name of the site, Qasr Bardawil (qasr meaning castle), with the Crusader king Baldwin I, called Bardawil in Arabic chronicles. The legend with all its elements (construction year 1105, with Hugh of St. Omer, who did indeed build Toron, as the man put in charge) was copied from one author to the next, from medieval chroniclers to noted modern medievalists such as Runciman and Prawer, until the archaeological survey done by Israeli archaeologists right after the Six-Day War, in 1968, and published in 1972, dated the site to the Bronze Age (Judea, Samaria and the Golan: Archaeological Survey 1967-1968, The Archaeological Survey of Israel and Carta, editor Moshe Kochavi).

The castle was one of three, including Chastel Neuf and the castle at Toron, built by the Crusaders in the region. The uncompleted castle of al-Al was first used in 1105 and Hugh was killed returning there after a successful raid in Damascene territory, after which Toghtekin, not wishing to have a Frankish stronghold less than two days' march of Damascus, attacked and easily conquered site, killing or taking captive the defenders. The Franks then abandoned the site as too difficult to defend, relocating to Cave de Suète.

== Crusader findings at al-'Al ==
A 1969 survey of the village of al-'Al revealed pottery typical of the Crusader period in the centre of the village, where ancient ruins of different ages were identified over an area of about 100 dunams (c. 25 acres). Further possible Crusader-period findings were the large ashlars with chiselled margins found in traces of walls visible beneath the modern village, which could suggest that a large medieval building had once protected the spring located in the wadi below, possibly associated with the fortress.

== Rejected identification with Qasr Bardawil ==
=== Location and description ===
Qasr Bardawil (Arabic: قصر بردويل, coordinates: 32°49′11.23″N 35°44′32.57″E) is an archaeological site on the Golan Heights containing the ruins of a fortified settlement.

It held a strategic position that could potentially control the Roman road from Baysan to Damascus, and is located some 12 kilometres (7.5 mi) east of the Lake of Tiberias

The triangular rocky spur measures about 110 metres (360 ft) from north to south, with its northern side about 90 metres (300 ft) wide. It is bordered by slopes to the east and west, with the level northern approach once protected by a just faintly discernible ditch, followed inward by a casemate wall, of which only traces of the oval and rectangular chambers remain along with masses of collapsed unmortared masonry.

=== Attempted identification ===
Paul Deschamps surveyed the area in the 1930s and identified the fortified spur known as Qasr Bardawil with a Crusader castle mentioned in a Damascene chronicle, allegedly built by King Baldwin I. Deschamps argued that Qasr Bardawil was a Crusader castle, which dominated a village by the name of al-'Al Denys Pringle quotes "Deschaps and others" as supporting this theory.

Bardawil is the way the Frankish name of King Baldwin is rendered in Arabic. This fact and the site's location made it appear to be a good candidate for the castle mentioned by Qalanisi.

=== Rejection ===
A 1968 archaeological survey of the site concluded that its main habitation period dates to the Middle Bronze Age II. As a result, its identification with an alleged Crusader castle has been found to be unsubstantiated. Pringle lists the ruins at Qasr Bardawil under "Rejects" in his gazetteer of Crusader fortifications, due to lack of medieval material at the site.

=== Conclusion ===
In spite of the site's location and Arabic name, the survey results exclude it from being the Crusader castle mentioned by Qalanisi. Therefore, Micaela Sinibaldi considers the castle to be, as of 2014, still unidentified.

=== Gallery ===
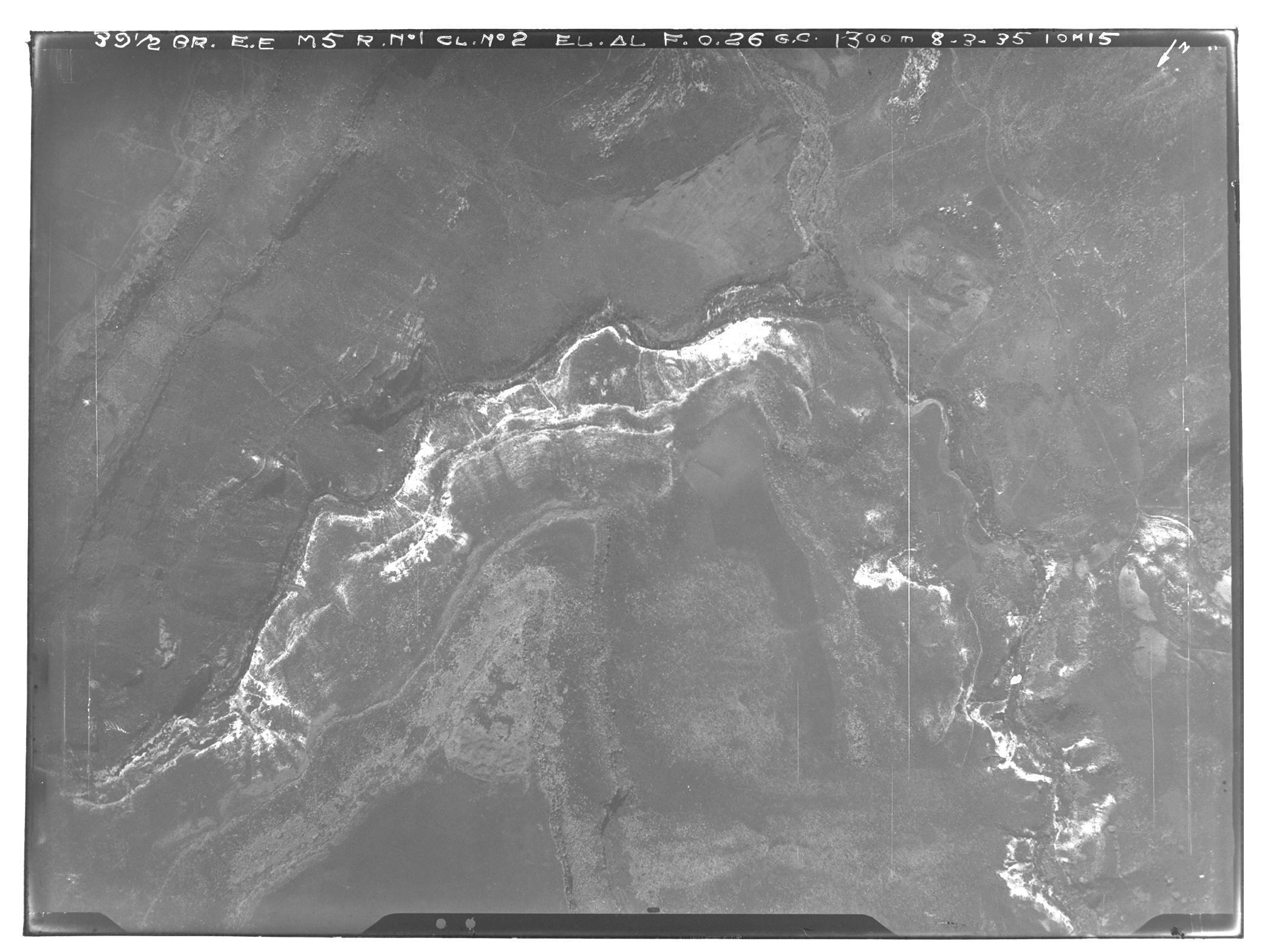
1935 vertical aerial view of al-'Al

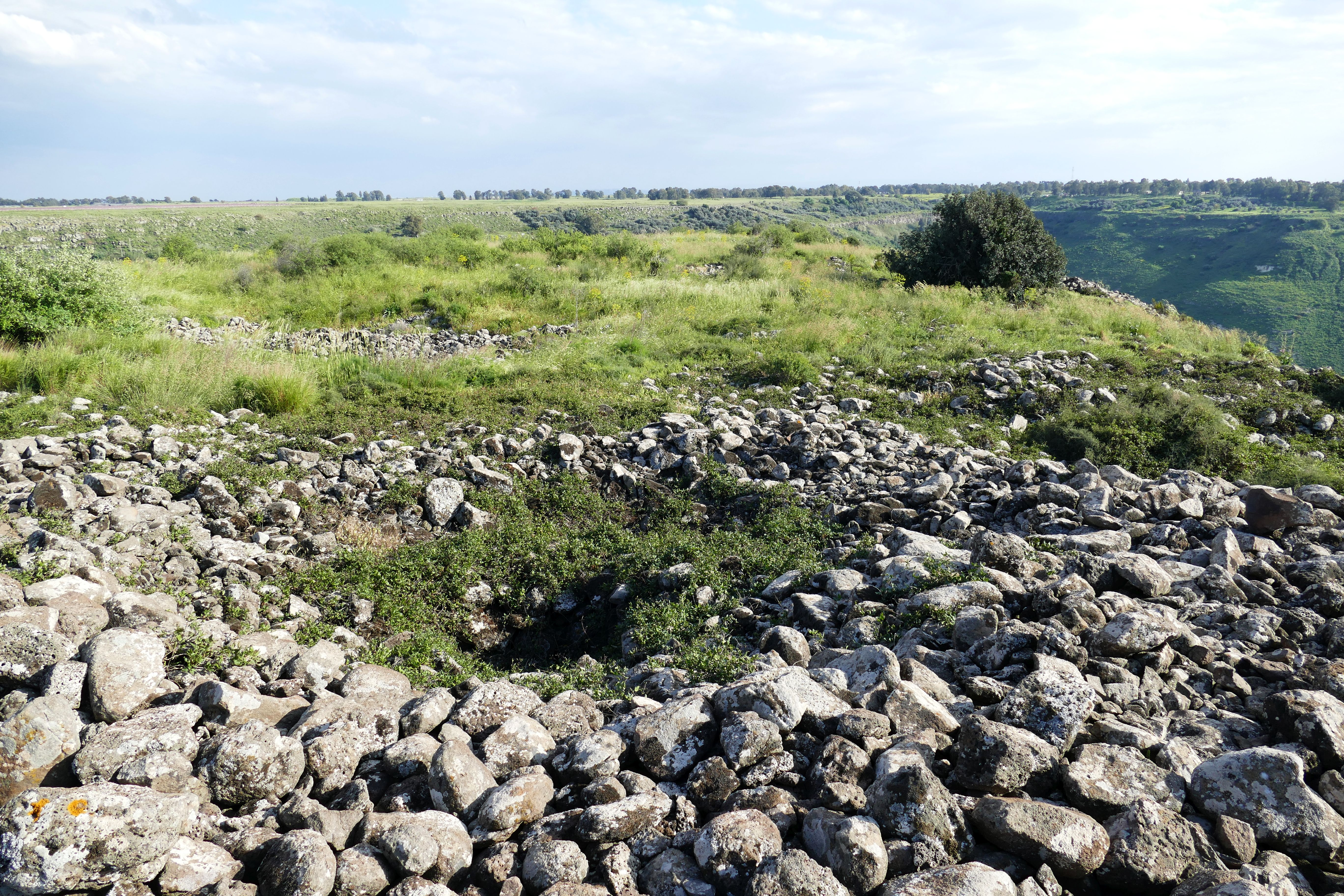
Qasr Bardawil, Bronze Age site on the Golan Heights (2021)

== Bibliography ==
- Devais, Cèdric (2010). James Schryver (ed.). A Seigneury on the Eastern Border of the Kingdom of Jerusalem: The Terre de Suète. BRILL. pp. 71–92 [74]. ISBN 9789004181755.
- Gibb, H. A. R. (transl., ed.) (2002) [1932]. The Damascus Chronicle of the Crusades: Extracted and translated from the chronicle of Ibn Al-Qalanisi. Mineola, NY: Dover Publications. Unabridged reprint of first edition, London: Luzac (1932). pp. 71–2. ISBN 978-0-486-42519-1.
- Gibson, Shimon; Urman, Dan. "Three Coins of Alexander Jannaeus from El 'AI in the Golan Heights" (PDF). Bulletin of the Anglo-Israel Archaeological Society. 10 (1990-1). London: The Anglo-Israel Archaeological Society: 69.
- Kennedy, Hugh (2001) [1994]. Crusader Castles. Cambridge University Press. pp. 40, 52–53. ISBN 9780521799133.
- Pringle, D. (1997). Secular Buildings in the Crusader Kingdom of Jerusalem: An Archaeological Gazetteer. Cambridge University Press. ISBN 9780521460101.
  - Qasr Bardawil (R14), p. 117: "Identified by Deschamps and others as a castle built by Baldwin I in 1105 ... However, more recent survey suggests the occupation to be principally Middle Bronze Age II."
  - Qal'at Hunin (No. 164), p. 79. Accessed 4 October 2021.
- Runciman, Steven (1999) [1951]. A History of the Crusades, Volume Two: The Kingdom of Jerusalem and the Frankish East, 1100-1187 (1999 reprint of 1st ed.). Cambridge University Press. p. 95. ISBN 0-521-34771-8.
- Sharon, Moshe. Corpus Inscriptionum Arabicarum Palaestinae (CIAP) Volume Two: B-C. BRILL, 1997, ISBN 9789004110830, p. 34. Accessed 19 July 2019.
- Sinibaldi, Micaela (2014). Settlement in Crusader Transjordan (1100–1189): a Historical and Archaeological Study (PDF). Cardiff University (PhD in Archaeology thesis). pp. 17–18, 56–57.
