= Battle of Rastan (January–February 2012) =

Coordinates: 34.91525°N 36.735485°E

- Part of the Early insurgency phase of the Syrian Civil War
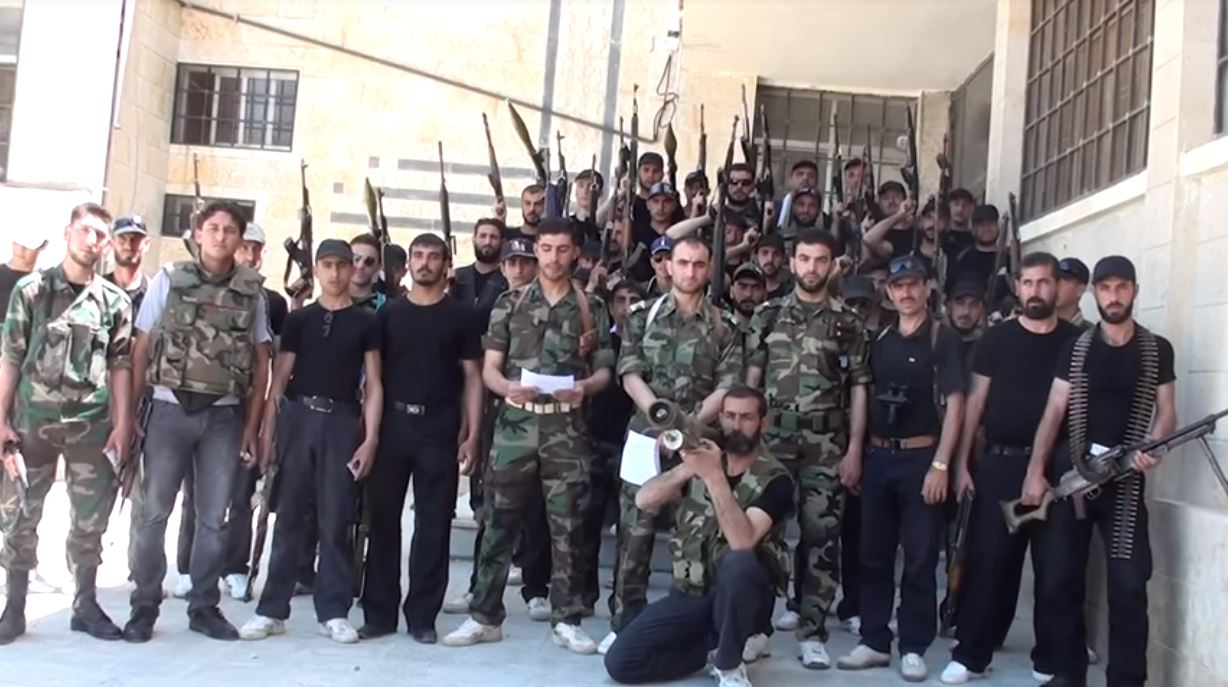
- Free Syrian Army fighters in Rastan
Date	29 January – 5 February 2012 (1 week)
Location	Rastan, Homs Governorate, Syria
Result	Syrian opposition victory: Free Syrian Army takes control of most of Rastan on 1 February; FSA takes full control of the city and its suburbs on 5 February; Syrian Army bombardment continues

Belligerents
(Syrian opposition) Syrian Opposition	(Syria) Syrian Government

Commanders and leaders
(Syrian opposition) Col. Jihad Ahmad † (Note: Killed four days after the battle) (Syrian opposition) Maj. Ali Ayyoub (Syrian opposition) Lt. Ibrahim Ayyoub	Unknown

Units involved
(Syrian opposition) Free Syrian Army; Khalid ibn al-Walid Brigade; Men of God Battalion	Syrian Armed Forces; Syrian Army; 1st Armoured Division; 44th Armoured Brigade; Security agencies; Shabiha

Casualties and losses
(Syrian opposition) 18 fighters killed	2+ soldiers killed
- 24 civilians killed

A second battle between the Syrian Army and the Free Syrian Army for control of the city of Rastan took place from 29 January to 5 February 2012. Located in Homs Governorate, Rastan is a city of 60,000 residents. The FSA captured Rastan after days of intense fighting, according to residents and the opposition.

== Battle ==
The first reports of major battles in Rastan were on 29 January 2012, after the Arab League mission and the subsequent cease fire, when three deserters were killed. A local activist in Rastan, who said the clashes lasted six hours, confirmed the toll. "A large number of soldiers in the countless checkpoints inside the city deserted and turned their arms on the regime's soldiers," he said. "Residents are trying to help deserters fight their way out of Rastan and reach the positions of the Free Syrian Army," added the activist, who spoke on condition of anonymity. "There are regular small demonstrations in the streets, but only a few people come out because snipers are everywhere and the army is carrying out mass arrests every time there is a protest." By the end of the day, an FSA video statement claimed that they controlled the city of 40,000 residents. However, the fighting continued.

On 30 January, a defected first lieutenant said that the Hamza Battalion of the Khaled Brigade "routed regime forces from several neighborhoods in the western side of Rastan and vowed to continue fighting until the remaining neighborhoods were liberated". Their commander, Major Ali Ayyoub, confirmed this and said "The Assad army is on the defensive now. They are stranded in a few pockets. They only move forward after they receive reinforcements and the Free Syrian Army is always there to intercept their movements." The Hamza Battalion claimed it had destroyed four army posts, two tanks, and several other armored vehicles. Activists posted a video of a destroyed tank that corroborates at least part of the FSA's claims. In the video, severe damage can be seen on the surrounding buildings. Still residents seemed buoyed by the successes of the FSA. An online video was posted of a protest held "under the protection of the Free Syrian Army". Activists reported that five civilians were killed by loyalists who shelled the city during the battle. Maj. Ayyoub refused to disclose how many FSA soldiers were participating in the defense of the city, citing security reasons, but he had put the number in the hundreds.

The next day, on 31 January, defectors gained full control of the city, according to a town activist.

Loyalist tanks were still able to shell the city, one such attack killing 10 civilians and wounding 15 others when a building was brought down. Local activists also claimed that 20 more had been killed during the battle, with the bodies being put in a mosque with the victims of the building being destroyed.

On 1 February, more fighting in the town reportedly left 15 defectors and two soldiers dead.

On 5 February, the FSA declared Rastan "liberated". A leader of an opposition battalion said that 42 people were killed in the city of Rastan in the previous days.

== Aftermath ==
During an artillery attack on 9 February, FSA colonel Jihad Muhammad Ahmad was killed.

On 13 February, government tanks attempted to push into the town of Rastan. However, they were repelled by the Free Syrian Army and at least three soldiers were killed.

After retaking the Baba Amr district in Homs, in an assault where 700 rebels and civilians were killed according to Human Rights Watch, security forces began to intensively shell the town of Rastan. NOW News reported that at least 12 civilians, were killed by a rocket strike on a crowd of protesters during the bombardment on Friday the second of March. On 4 March, seven civilians, including four children, were killed by government shelling. The victims included six family members killed when a rocket slammed into their home, alleged the UK-based Syrian Observatory for Human Rights which claimed intensive shelling of Rastan throughout the day. CNN reported that 15 rockets fell in 15 minutes.

A staff general of the army announced his defection on 6 March because of the army's shelling of Rastan. He posted a video, in which he showed his identification card and was flanked by other officers and stated:

"I declare my defection from the Syrian Army to the Free Syrian Army, because of the artillery bombing against Rastan which is continuing violently. Houses have been damaged and children and women were killed. This is not the right behaviour of the Syrian Army, and that's why I declare my defection to the Free Syrian Army. Long live free Syria."

A week later, on 16 March, two civilians were killed by government shelling. On 27 March, three members of the military were killed when the government tried to enter Rastan but were repelled. Three days later, two brigadier generals defected to the FSA in Rastan. Videos showed the generals announcing their allegiance to the Free Syrian Army while showing their military identification cards.

On 14 May, activists reported that shells had rained down on Rastan at the rate of one shell per minute. Nine people were killed in the bombardment. Among the dead was a local rebel commander. In response, opposition fighters attacked three armoured vehicles carrying government troops as they were heading to Rastan, reportedly killing 23 soldiers.

In late May, a BBC reporter within the city reported that the rebels were locked in constant street fighting with the government forces which were responding with sporadic artillery shelling.
