= Jawbar, Homs =

Jawbar جوبر Jobar
- Village
- Location in Syria
- Coordinates: 34°41′27″N 36°40′23″E
- Country: Syria
- Governorate: Homs
- District: Homs
- Subdistrict: Homs

Population (2004)
  - Total: 4,242
- Time zone: UTC+3 (AST)

Jawbar (Arabic: جوبر, also spelled Jobar) is a village in central Syria, administratively part of the Homs Governorate, located south of Homs. According to the Syria Central Bureau of Statistics (CBS), Jawbar had a population of 4,242 in the 2004 census. Its inhabitants are predominantly Sunni Muslims.
