= Al-'Al =

Abandoned Syrian village in the Golan Heights

Al-'Al الْعَال
- Village
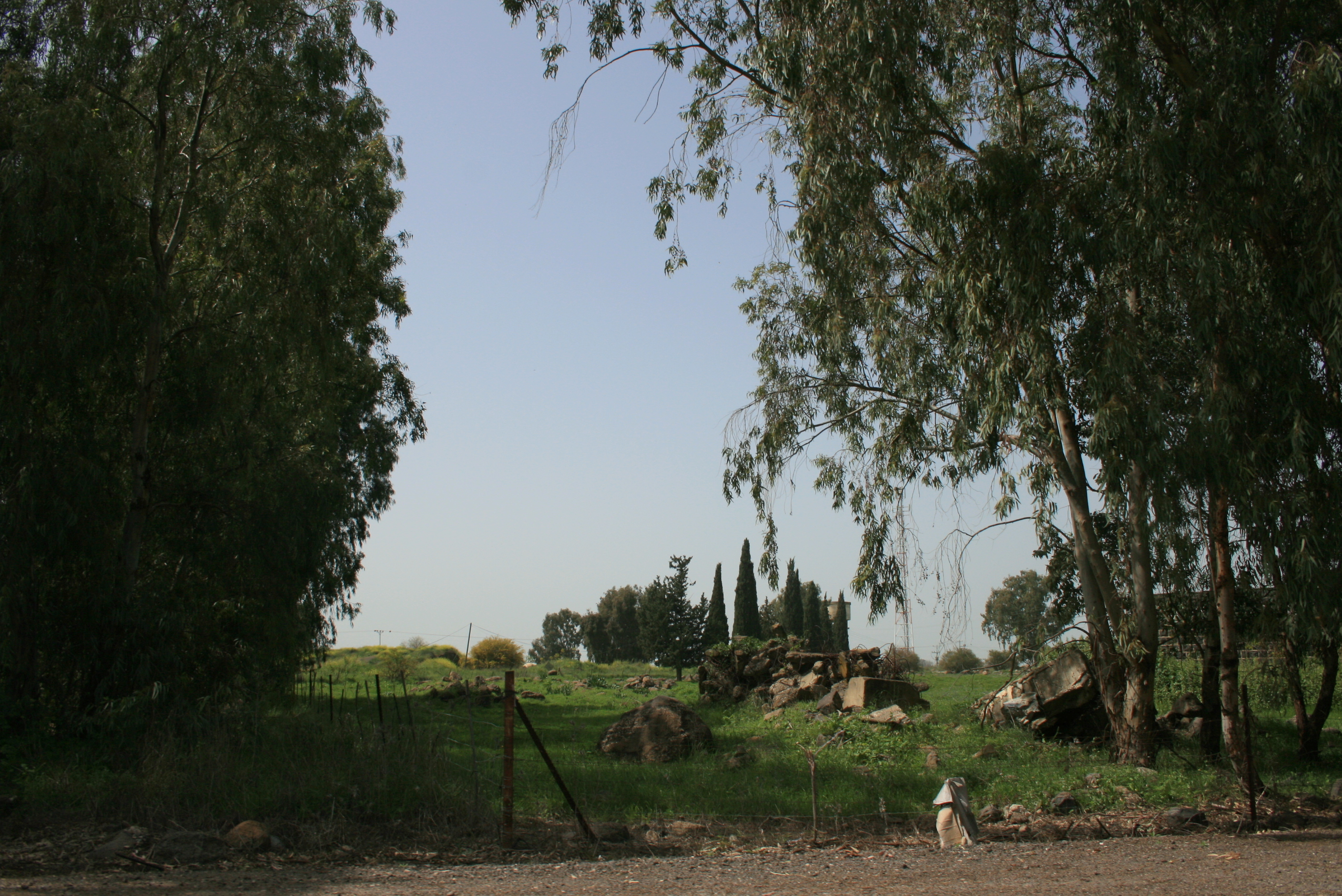
- Ruins of Al-'Al

- Al-'Al in Syria Al-'Al (the Golan Heights)
- Coordinates: 32°48′11″N 35°44′43″E
- Grid position: 220/245 PAL
- Country: Syria
- Governorate: Quneitra
- District: Quneitra
- Region: Golan Heights
- Destroyed: June 10, 1967
- Elevation: 366 m (1,201 ft)

Al-'Al (Arabic: الْعَال, romanized: al-ʿĀl, trans. "the high place"), is a former Syrian village in the southern Golan Heights, on the southern tributary of Wadi es-Samakh. Israel occupied the area during the Six-Day War. The village was abandoned and dismantled.

During the French Mandate for Syria and Lebanon, the name was spelt "El Al" on French maps.

== History ==
Archaeological remains of several Roman, Hellenistic, early Arab, Medieval, and Ottoman artifacts at the site give evidence of ancient settlement. The town was inhabited by Pagans and had a history of being a military position.

In 1812, the place was described as a "ruined village." A modern village was probably established during the second half of the 19th century. In 1884, Gottleib Schumacher noted the village as a flourishing settlement:

El-Al fC. 7). — A large, well-built village, on the point of reviving. It is close to the fall of the wady o the same name, and comprises 65 dwellings, mostly built of stone, with pretty summer huts on the roofs made of willows. The 320 adult inhabitants cultivate the good, stoneless field, of the contiguous high plain, and are pretty well independent of the usurers, who have already most of the villages of the high plain in their power. In the east of the village an abundant spring with an insignificant flow. It has a setting of flag stones. The dwellings of the Sheikh are spacious and carefully built, and in them strangers are hospitably entertained by the tribal Sheikh, who comes from the most respected old family of the land. The half-forgotten ancient name of the village seems to have been 'Ain el-Kahwa; but I cannot go bail for this information, as it appears only to have remained in the remembrance of a few old people of the village. "

The Israeli settlement of Eliad was built nearby.

During the Yom Kippur War, the Syrian 5th Infantry Division set up a defence in depth strategy at the Al 'Al ridgeline.

== See also ==
- Qasr Bardawil, an archaeological site from a mountain spur near Al-'Al, now classified as a Bronze Age fortification but previously misidentified as the Crusader castle of al-Al
- Syrian towns and villages depopulated in the Arab-Israeli conflict

== Bibliography ==
- Gregg, Robert C. (2000). "Marking Religious and Ethnic Boundaries: Cases from the Ancient Golan Heights". Church History. 69 (3). American Society of Church History, Cambridge University Press: 519–557. doi:10.2307/3169396. ISSN 0009-6407. JSTOR 3169396.
