= Al-Mazraa, Homs =

Al-Mazra'a المزرعة
- Village
- Location in Syria
- Coordinates: 34°43′39″N 36°39′23″E
- Country: Syria
- Governorate: Homs
- District: Homs
- Subdistrict: Khirbet Tin Nur

Population (2004)
  - Total: 2,519
- Time zone: UTC+3 (AST)

Al-Mazra'a (Arabic: المزرعة) is a village in northern Syria located west of Homs in the Homs Governorate. According to the Syria Central Bureau of Statistics, al-Mazra'a had a population of 2,519 in the 2004 census. Its inhabitants are predominantly Shia Muslims and Alawites.
