= Amr ibn Abasa =

Amr ibn Abasa (Arabic: عمرو بن عبسة) was one of the Sahaba and one of the narrators of hadith.

== Biography ==
By his own account, 'Amr ibn 'Abasa met Muhammad in Mecca in the early days of his prophethood, and asked him, "What are you?" He replied, "I am a Prophet." 'Amr then asked, "What is a Prophet?" He replied, "I have been sent by God." "What has God sent you with?" 'Amr asked. "With the commandment to destroy idols and to treat one's relatives with kindness; to believe in one God and not to treat anyone as His partner," replied Muhammad.

He died in Homs and was buried there. He had a son named Abd-Allah.

== See also ==
- Baba Amr
