= Battle of Rastan (2011) =

Battle

First Battle of Rastan
- Part of the early insurgency phase of the Syrian civil war
Date	27 September – 1 October 2011 (4 days)
Location	Rastan, Homs Governorate, Syria 34°54′55″N 36°44′08″E
Result	Syrian government victory
Territorial changes	Syrian government forces regain control of Rastan

Belligerents
(Syrian opposition) Syrian Opposition	(Syria) Syrian Government

Commanders and leaders
(Syrian opposition) Maj. Abdul Rahman Sheikh Ali † (Syrian opposition) 1st Lt. Ahmad Mustafa al-Khalaf †	(Syria) Unknown

Units involved
(Syrian opposition) Free Syrian Army; Khalid ibn al-Walid Battalion; (Syrian opposition) Opposition protesters	Syrian Armed Forces; Syrian Army; 1st Armoured Division; Syrian Air Force

Strength
(Syrian opposition) 1,000 rebels	900 soldiers 250 tanks and armored vehicles

Casualties and losses
(Syrian opposition) 130 rebels and protesters killed (Syrian opposition) 3,000 opposition supporters arrested	13 soldiers killed 32 soldiers wounded
- *The number of dead on the rebel side includes both opposition fighters and civilian protesters
- Location within Syria

A battle for control of Rastan, a city of 60,000 residents in Homs Governorate, Syria, occurred from 27 September to 1 October 2011. In late September, there were reports of numerous Syrian Army defections in the area, following which the Free Syrian Army took control of Rastan. After a four-day battle, the city was retaken by the Syrian Army.

== Background ==
On 28 May 2011, after major protests, the Syrian Army launched an operation in Rastan and the neighboring town of Talbiseh, which resulted in the suppression of anti-government protests and numerous deaths. The Syrian Army met some armed opposition during the operation, but had gained control of the city by 4 June.

== Battle ==
In late September, there were reports of many Syrian Army defections in Rastan, and the Free Syrian Army claimed to have destroyed 17 armoured vehicles during clashes in the city, using RPGs and booby traps. The assault was also, the opposition claimed, supported by Syrian Air Force jets.

By 1 October, government forces had launched a major offensive to reassert control over Rastan. According to opposition activists, these operations resulted in the deaths of approximately 120 individuals, including both civilians and opposition fighters. In a sweeping crackdown, the regime also arrested an estimated 3,000 suspected opposition members.

The retaking of the city was realized through a coordinated effort involving some 900 loyalist soldiers in conjunction with an armoured contingent of around 250 tanks and other military vehicles .During the operation, government troops reportedly confronted hundreds of defected soldiers; fellow soldiers who had turned against President Bashar al‑Assad. These encounters occurred even as large demonstrations reportedly filled the streets on a Friday during the offensive.

The scenes were described with tanks entering Rastan to fight troops who turned against President Bashar al‑Assad; amid a backdrop of widespread protests.

== Aftermath ==
Insurgent activity continued in the area for months after the major clashes ended. On 24 November, the military conducted an operation in Rastan, during which they killed 16 gunmen and captured a large cache of weapons.

On 1 February 2012, the FSA and Syrian opposition activists reported that the FSA had gained full control of Rastan after four days of intense clashes. Photos were posted on the internet showing FSA fighters in the streets of Rastan, standing guard.
