= Khalid ibn al-Walid Brigade =

Former Syrian rebel group

- لواء خالد بن الوليد
- Leaders: Maj. Abdul Rahman Sheikh Ali †; Capt. Iyad al-Deek †; Hasan al-Ashtar (executed); Capt. Abdullah Bahdouh; Lt. Omar Shamsi
- Dates active: July 2011–December 2014
- Group: Farouq Battalion (2011)
- Headquarters: Al-Rastan, Syria
- Active regions: Homs Governorate
- Part of: (Syrian opposition) Free Syrian Army: Syrian Revolutionaries Front (until July 2014); Free Officers Movement (until 23 September 2011) Homs Military Council
- Wars: the Syrian Civil War

The Khalid ibn al-Walid Brigade (Arabic: لواء خالد بن الوليد), originally called the Khalid ibn al-Walid Battalion (Arabic: كتيبة خالد بن الوليد), was a Syrian rebel group affiliated with the Free Syrian Army which was active during the Syrian Civil War. The group was one of the first FSA-affiliated rebel groups to be formed in Syria. It operated in the Homs Governorate and participated in the Siege of Homs from 2011 to 2014, when it became defunct.

== Ideology ==
The group was named after Khalid ibn al-Walid, an early Islamic figure. Most fighters from the group were religious and conservative Sunni Muslims who used religious rhetoric and Sunni Islamic discourse.

== History ==
The Khalid ibn al-Walid Battalion was formed as part of the Free Officers Movement by "several hundred" defected soldiers and officers from the Syrian Armed Forces in the city of al-Rastan, north of Homs in July 2011. One of its main early commanders was Abdul Rahman Sheikh Ali, a major who defected from the Syrian Army in August 2011. It initially conducted insurgent attacks against Syrian government security forces in Homs and its surrounding areas, which killed a number of policemen and soldiers in the Syrian Army. The Khalid ibn al-Walid Battalion was the main rebel group which fought in the Battle of Rastan from September to October 2011. During the battle, Major Abdul Rahman Sheikh Ali was killed in action.

In late January 2012, the group, along with several other FSA factions, stormed the city of Rastan and took full control of it by 5 February. Rastan was then besieged by the Syrian Army and many rebels withdrew from the city by 5 March 2012.

The brigade became one of the groups in the Syrian Revolutionaries Front between December 2013 and mid-2014. In July 2014, during the al-Nusra Front–SRF/Hazzm Movement conflict, the commander of the Khalid ibn al-Walid Brigade, Hassan Ashtar, announced that his group would leave the SRF to become an independent faction, and it will not fight "Islamist brigades" such as al-Qaeda's al-Nusra Front. Despite this, clashes erupted between the two groups and Hassan Ashtar was beheaded by the al-Nusra Front in Rastan on 20 December 2014. Several other FSA commanders were also captured by al-Nusra, and Nusra took full control of Rastan.

== War crimes ==
Rebels from the group reportedly kidnapped and threatened to kill more than 100 Alawite civilians in August 2011. They also shot and killed a 15-year-old child of an alleged spy for the Syrian government in September 2011.

In December 2012, a child soldier in the group beheaded two prisoners of war. The group claims to have executed 80 other POWs.
