= Siege of Homs =

Siege in Syria

- Part of the Syrian Civil War
- Map of the frontline shifts from February 2012 to January 2017 Syrian government control Syrian opposition control
Date	6 May 2011 – 9 May 2014^{[a]} (3 years and 3 days)
Location	Homs, Syria 34°43′51″N 36°42′34″E
Result	Syrian government victory
Territorial changes	Syrian government forces regain control over Homs

Belligerents
Syrian Opposition; (Syrian opposition) Free Syrian Army (Note: From October 2011 onwards.); (Syria) Free Officers Movement (Note: 9 June 2011 – mid-2012 (part of the Free Syrian Army since 23 September 2011)); Islamic Front; Al-Nusra Front	(Syria) Syrian Government Hezbollah SSNP Russia

Commanders and leaders
(Syrian opposition) Abdul Qader Saleh (Syrian opposition) Abdul Qadir al-Homsi † (FSA provincial commander) (Syrian opposition) Khadar Al Halouani † (FSA Homs city commander) (Syrian opposition) Col. Fatih Fahd Hasoon (FSA provincial Military Council leader) (Syrian opposition) Col. Ahmed Jumrek † (Syrian opposition) Lt. Abdul Razzaq Tlass (Farouq Brigades commander; until October 2012) (Syrian opposition) Lt. Abu Sayeh Juneidi (Farouq Brigades commander; since October 2012) (Syrian opposition) Abdul Rahman Orfalli † (protest leader) (Syrian opposition) Mohammed al-Sukni (Liwaa Al-Umma commander) (Syrian opposition) Abdul Baset Al-Sarout (WIA) (Bayyada Martyrs Battalion commander) (Syrian opposition) Ahmad Hassan Abou Assaad al-Sharkassi † (Bayyada Martyrs Battalion commander); Abou Souffiane † (Ahl Al Athar Brigade commander); Sheikh Abu Rateb (Liwa al-Haqq commander)	Maher al-Assad (since February 2012); Ghassan Afif; Mohamed Maaruf; Abdo al-Tallawi †; Nizar al-Hussein †

Units involved
(Syrian opposition) Free Syrian Army; (Syrian opposition) Homs Military Council; (Syrian opposition) Khalid ibn al-Walid Brigade; (Syrian opposition) Farouq Brigades; (Syrian opposition) Bayyada Martyrs Brigade; Islamic Front; Ahrar al-Sham; Liwa al-Haqq	Syrian Armed Forces; Syrian Army; 14th Special Forces Division; 556th SF regiment; 15th Special Forces Division; 35th SF Regiment; 127th SF Regiment; 403rd Armored Regiment; 4th Armoured Division; 555th SF regiment; 154th Artillery Regiment; Republican Guard; 104th Mechanized Brigade; 105th Mechanized Brigade; 11th Armored Division; 18th Armoured Division; 45th independent SF Regiment; 47th independent SF Regiment; 53rd independent SF Regiment; 54th independent SF Regiment; Syrian Air Force; National Defence Forces; Security agencies; Ministry of Interior; Syrian Police; Shabiha (Note: From 2011 to 2012 - disbanded.); Eagles of the Whirlwind; Hezbollah military; Unit 910

Strength
Unknown	6,000–10,000 troops 200–300 tanks

Casualties and losses
2,000–2,200 killed (June 2012–May 2014); 5,000–6,000 captured (by late July 2012)	859 soldiers and policemen killed (by mid-Feb. 2012)
- ^{a} The siege of the rebel-held Waer district continued until 21 May 2017, when the rebels evacuated the area.

The Siege of Homs was a military confrontation between the Syrian government and the Syrian opposition in the city of Homs, a major rebel stronghold during the Syrian Civil War. The siege lasted three years from May 2011 to May 2014, and ultimately resulted in an opposition withdrawal from the city.

Nationwide anti-government protests began in March 2011, and clashes between security forces and protestors in Homs intensified in April. In early May 2011, the Syrian military conducted a crackdown against anti-government protesters in Homs, some of whom were armed and fired on security forces. Though government forces had succeeded in temporarily quelling the March–April Daraa protests during a similar military operation, their early May operation in Homs failed in quickly subduing the civil resistance. By September, sectarian clashes and bloodshed in Homs between Alawites and Sunnis played a larger role in the Homs unrest than in the rest of Syria.

In late October 2011, a Free Syrian Army (FSA) brigade consisting of many defected army officers repeatedly ambushed government security forces around the Baba Amr neighbourhood of Homs and, through early November, successfully defended it from government counterattacks. In late December, an Arab mission was sent to monitor the situation following an Arab League plan to dissuade the government crackdown. Following the abortive mission, the Syrian Army in February 2012 launched an offensive against Baba Amr, shelling the entire district and blocking all supply routes. In early March, government forces launched a ground assault into Baba Amr, forcing the rebels to withdraw from the neighborhood.

By early May 2012, following a United Nations-brokered ceasefire, only sporadic street fighting and shelling occurred. During this time, the government was in control of most of the city while the opposition held between 15% and 20% of it; fighting for control of a similar-sized area was still ongoing. In December 2012, the Syrian Army captured the district of Deir Baalba, leaving only the Old City, Khalidiya district, and a few other areas under rebel control.

In early March 2013, government forces launched an assault into several opposition-controlled neighborhoods, but the rebels–reinforced by units that arrived from the nearby rebel-controlled town of al-Qusayr–repelled the attacks. In mid-March, rebels attempted to retake Baba Amr but were forced to pull back later in the month. In late March and early April, the Iranian-backed Shia militia Hezbollah fully intervened in the siege, reinforcing Syrian government forces. In late July, government forces captured the Khalidiya district.

In early May 2014, following an agreement reached between the government and the opposition, rebel forces were allowed to evacuate the city, leaving Homs under full government control.

== Background ==
On 15 March 2011, a protest movement against the Syrian government, particularly its corruption and repression, began to escalate as simultaneous demonstrations took place in major cities across Syria. The protests spread to Homs on 18 March after online calls for a "Friday of Dignity" (Arabic: جمعة الكرامة) in which thousands of demonstrators took to the streets after Friday prayers. Police conducted many arrests and assaulted protesters while attempting to disperse the crowds. As protests continued into April, security forces began firing on demonstrators, resulting in dozens of deaths. Homs, once one of the most restive cities in Syria, became what some activists labeled the "Capital of the Revolution".

== Siege ==
=== May 2011 resistance ===
On 6 May 2011, following a successful operation against protestors in Daraa, the Syrian military confronted and clashed with protesters, after Friday prayers, in Homs. According to the opposition, 15 protesters were killed during the clashes, while the government stated that 11 soldiers and policemen were killed, including five at one checkpoint, after they were attacked by unknown gunmen. On the night of 7 May, the military cut electricity to Homs. The next day, 8 May, Army units–assisted by tanks–entered several of the city's districts, including Baba Amr and Bab Sebaa, as soldiers conducted a manhunt for all known opposition activists and supporters. That day, unidentified gunmen attacked a bus entering the city that was carrying workers who were returning from work in Lebanon, killing ten people and wounding three.

By 10 May, the military had reportedly established total control over Homs. However, the next morning, tank and machine gun fire was heard in the Baba Amr district and in some nearby villages. Five to nine people were reported to have been killed in the clashes.

On 11 May, Bedouin villages in the Homs area were also reportedly targeted by the military operation. On 12 May, it was reported that security forces arrested a veteran human rights campaigner, Naji Tayara.

On 20 May, anti-Assad demonstrations in Homs were reportedly met with machine gun fire from security forces, leaving 11 people dead. One week later, on 27 May, another anti-government protest was suppressed by the military in clashes that left three people dead. On 30 May, seven protestors and one member of the security forces were killed in clashes in the city.

=== July–November 2011 ===
On 17 July, army tanks and troops deployed and took up positions in Dawar Al Khalidya in Homs and killed at least 30 people. The operation was apparently prompted after three government supporters were kidnapped a week prior and killed, with their dismembered bodies being returned to their relatives on 17 July.

By September 2011, sectarian bloodshed, such as assassinations of academics without clear ties to protestors nor to the central government, played a larger role in Homs than in the rest of Syria.

Throughout September and October there were reported clashes in the northern section of the city, especially the neighborhood of Dayr Baalba. There was also occasional violence in Bab al-Sebaa, Baba Amr and other places. In late September, fighting in the nearby town of Rastan forced several rebel groups to flee to Homs. In late October, one of the rebel groups, the Khalid ibn al-Walid Brigade of the Free Syrian Army (FSA), which consisted of many defected Syrian army officers, repeatedly ambushed government security forces around Baba Amr and, through early November, became its garrison force.

On the night of 28 October, fierce clashes involving the Free Syrian Army and government forces broke out in Bab al-Sebaa district. The next day, these clashes spread to Baba Amr and al-Qusur. During the street fighting in Bab al-Sebaa, 17 soldiers were killed, while 20 soldiers were killed and 53 wounded in Baba Amr.

In early November, government forces began a clearance operation in response to continued armed resistance in the Homs area by the Free Syrian Army. On 3 November, tanks opened fire on the Baba Amr district, where soldiers were killed several days prior by rebels. By the next day, more than 100 people, including civilians, were reportedly killed in the operations; several tanks were reportedly destroyed by the FSA during the clashes. On 8 November, it was reported that the Syrian Army took firm control of Baba Amr and that the armed defectors went into hiding.

On 24 November, a number of defecting soldiers were killed and four wounded during clashes on the western outskirts of Homs. Later, the military conducted raids against farms further to the west, killing another 15 people.

=== November–December 2011 escalation and rebel momentum ===
On 25 November 2011, six elite pilots, one technical officer and three other personnel were killed in Homs in an ambush. The Syrian government vowed to "cut every evil hand" of the attackers as a result. The Free Syrian Army claimed responsibility for the attack on the air base staff.

In early December, a Sky News correspondent, Stuart Ramsay, was able to smuggle himself and his crew into Homs with the help of the Free Syrian Army. The foreign news crew reported there was heavy fighting in the besieged city each day despite the heavy presence of Syrian army checkpoints and that, after the central square became too dangerous, the FSA had established their own checkpoints aimed at protecting civilians during demonstrations in suburbs and city alleys; video had surfaced that purportedly showed defectors and rebels in control of Baba Amr again, with a checkpoint at the entrance to check for "shabiha infiltrators", a reference to pro-government militiamen. According to Ramsay's account, Homs was by now undoubtedly a war zone which had already entered into a state of full-scale civil war.

On 4 December, heavy fighting raged during which at least five FSA insurgents were killed and one wounded. Around 5 December 61 people were reported to be dead, 34 Sunnis and 27 Alawites. The British-based, pro-opposition conflict monitor Syrian Observatory for Human Rights (SOHR) said an activist on the ground reported seeing "the bodies of 34 civilians, in a square in the pro-regime neighbourhood of Al-Zahra, who had been abducted by the shabiha [pro-government militia] on Monday", according to Agence France-Presse (AFP). The civilians, the group said, had been seized from several "anti-regime neighbourhoods" in Homs, probably meaning Baba Amr. The SOHR also reported the "shabiha" abducted a bus driver and his 13 passengers in Homs Governorate on the same day. Both government and opposition forces blamed each other for the civilian killings, but both sides stated that they themselves had enough motive for the killings of the Sunnis and the Alawites, showing the beginning of possible sectarian violence in the conflict.

On 8 December, a pipeline carrying oil from the east of the country to a refinery in Homs was blown up, an activist group said. The group said flames could be seen at the site of the explosion; online video footage of the purported blast site showed black clouds of smoke rising above a built-up area. One Army tank was destroyed and seen burning on a city street.

On 9 December, fears of a massacre by government forces were building, due to a build up of troops, shabiha government militia, and checkpoints; "500" tanks were claimed to have been seen on the outskirts of the city.

On 18 December, six soldiers, including an officer, were killed in fierce clashes between regular army units and defectors near the provincial town of al-Qusayr that also left one civilian dead. According to the SOHR, "Three armoured vehicles were destroyed and those inside were wounded and killed".

In mid-December, a Der Spiegel crew managed to smuggle themselves into Homs where they observed the FSA-controlled Baba Amr district, noting the rebel checkpoints erected at the edge of the district. According to a local FSA commander, shabiha and army snipers were positioned in approximately 200 places in Homs and were shooting on everything that moved in designated zones such as Cairo street, which runs through the center of the city. Reportedly, the FSA did not have the strength to repel a potential all-out Syrian Army assault on Baba Amr, instead planning to retreat and wait until the bulk of government forces withdrew from the district post-capture, as they did in October.

On 24 December, thousands of troops entered the city with around 4,000 surrounding the embattled Baba Amr district and digging trenches. The military subsequently assaulted five neighbourhoods and heavy shelling was reported deep into the night. The military continued their shelling until 26 December, killing 33–34 people on the third day of the bombardment.

By the end of 2011, the FSA's Khalid ibn al-Walid Brigade continued to control the Baba Amr neighbourhood.

=== Arab League mission and deescalation ===
In early December 2011, the Syrian government accepted an Arab League plan to send observers to monitor the situation on the ground along with agreeing to withdraw army equipment from cities. On 27 December, activists told Al Arabiya that at least 61 civilians had died in the shelling of Homs in recent days but reported a withdrawal of Syrian army tanks and a halt to ongoing military operations in the city. Basil al-Sayed, a citizen journalist who regularly filmed security forces cracking down on anti-government protesters in the Baba Amr neighbourhood, of which he was a resident, had died in a local hospital of gunshot wounds on the same day. He was reportedly shot by security forces. His footage appeared on the sites of loose-knit citizen news organisations. The Committee to Protect Journalists said it was investigating the circumstances surrounding the death.

Some 70,000 protesters gathered in central Homs during the official visit of the Arab League observer mission and were later dispersed by tear gas. The head of the Syrian National Council (SNC), Burhan Ghalioun, said that the Syrian government did not permit the Arab observers to tour the streets or to visit Baba Amr neighborhood.

On 28 December, the head of the Arab League observers, Sudanese Lieutenant General Mohammed Ahmed Mustafa al-Dabi, said the situation was calm in Homs and that there were no clashes. Dabi said that they saw some armored vehicles but no tanks and, overall, judged the situation as "reassuring so far". Although, he added that "there were some places where the situation was not good," and called for further inquiry. In contrast, one of the monitors speaking to Al Jazeera on the condition of anonymity said the situation in the city was "very dangerous" and that it is under constant shelling, and many videos posted online by activists seemed to show the orange-vested monitors come under fire. He said that some areas were under the control of the Free Syrian Army.

Activists and human rights groups strongly criticized the head of the Arab League monitors and his remarks; Omar Idilbi of the Local Coordination Committees, described Lt. Gen. Mustafa al-Dabi as a "senior officer with an oppressive regime that is known to repress opposition", adding that there are fears he might not be neutral. Haytham Manna, a prominent Paris-based dissident, urged the Arab League to replace Dabi or reduce his authority. "We know his history and his shallow experience in the area," he said. Amnesty International also criticized General Dabi, saying that he led Sudanese dictator Omar al-Bashir's military intelligence service until August 1995, when he was appointed head of external security in Sudan. "During the early 1990s, the military intelligence in Sudan was responsible for the arbitrary arrest and detention, enforced disappearance, and torture or other ill-treatment of numerous people in Sudan," it said in a statement. "The Arab League's decision to appoint as the head of the observer mission a Sudanese general on whose watch severe human rights violations were committed in Sudan risks undermining the League's efforts so far and seriously calls into question the mission's credibility," Amnesty said. Abd-al-Karim al-Rayhawi, head of the Syrian League, told the BBC that Dabi "won't be neutral" and would sympathise with the Assad regime and "its henchmen who are committing crimes against humanity round the clock in Syria". Dabi is wanted by the International Criminal Court as they have linked him to genocide against opposition in Darfur.

Human Rights Watch (HRW) later accused Syria's government of hiding prisoners held in its crackdown from Arab League observers visiting the country, saying Syrian authorities had transferred perhaps hundreds of detainees to off-limits military sites. Human Rights Watch interviewed a Syrian security officer in Homs who said that he received orders from his prison director to assist with irregular detainee transfers, adding that the orders came from the central government. "He estimated that on 21 and 22 December approximately 400 to 600 detainees were moved out of his detention facility to other places of detention," the unidentified official was quoted as saying. "Some detainees were moved in civilian jeeps and some in cargo trucks. My role was inside the prison, gathering the detainees and putting them in the cars. My orders from the prison director were to move the important detainees out," he said. He added they were being taken to a military missile factory in Zaidal, just outside Homs. HRW said his account was corroborated by other witnesses, including a detainee who said that among 150 people being held at one site were people who worked with journalists, defectors, and protesters. Sarah Leah Whitson, HRW's Middle East director, said the security officer also told them that the Syrian government was issuing police identification cards to its military officials, which the rights watchdog said was in violation of the Arab League accord. "Dressing soldiers in police uniforms does not meet the Arab League call to withdraw the army," said Whitson. "The Arab League needs to cut through Syrian government deception by pushing for full access to anywhere Syria is holding detainees."

The exiled spokesman of the armed rebels regrouped under the Free Syrian Army. In early January 2012 the FSA called the Arab League mission a failure and stated that they did not want them to stay in Syria even though the Syrian Army withdrew its heavy weapons from the city. The League's mission was finally ended at the end of the month.

=== January 2012 clashes and first Karm al-Zeitoun massacre ===
Situation in Homs, mid-January 2012

SANA state TV later claimed a colonel was captured by an "armed terrorist group" in the city on 11 January.

On 23 January, a military officer at the main city hospital told foreign journalists that rebels had taken control over two-thirds of the city with army casualties being at 4 to 5 dead and 10 to 50 wounded soldiers and security officials per day. The claim was corroborated by the opposition forces stating that they had indeed managed to wrestle control of over half the city and local residents also largely corroborated these reports.

On 24 January, the Local Coordination Committee reported that at least 18 people were killed when the army shelled two buildings in the Bab Tadmor district. A resident said "The buildings were six-story buildings. Many families remain missing. It is hard to confirm the exact number of those killed. A video posted on the internet shows two destroyed buildings, reduced to rubble said to have been the two attacked buildings."

On 27 January a brutal sectarian attack took place against Sunni Muslims in the city, killing at least 30 people. Government forces fired heavy mortar rounds on the Karm al-Zeitoun neighborhood of Homs, killing at least 16 people. Armed pro-Assad "shabiha" militiamen subsequently entered a building in the neighbourhood and massacred 14 members of a Sunni family. The Bahader family was found shot and hacked to death, including eight children under the age of 9. YouTube video footage captured by activists showed the family members' dead bodies, with wounds to the head and neck, including the children. There was no comment from Syrian authorities, but a local doctor said "Alawites who had remained in Karm al-Zeitoun mysteriously left four days ago, and the rumor was that they did so on orders by the authorities. Today we know why. We also have seventy people wounded. Field hospitals themselves are coming under mortar fire."

==== Death of Gilles Jacquier ====
On 11 January, a France 2 journalist, Gilles Jacquier, who covered conflicts in Iraq, Afghanistan, Kosovo and Algeria among others, was among several people killed in Homs, becoming the first foreign journalist to have died in the civil war. A witness in Homs, who asked not to be named, said the casualties were caused by rocket-propelled grenades (RPGs) fired during a pro-Assad rally, while a journalist who was with Jacquier told CNN's Nic Robertson that the attack was carried out by mortars. The SOHR quoted local activists as saying the journalists had been near the Akrama neighbourhood at the time. A BBC journalist told Le Figaro that Jacquier was killed when a rocket targeted a pro-Assad rally in an Alawite quarter of Homs, although another journalist said that Jacquier had been travelling in a vehicle with other journalists that had been hit by an RPG.

Nicolas Sarkozy, the French president, and Alain Juppe, the French foreign minister, condemned the killing and called on Syrian authorities to shed "full light" on the circumstances of Jacquier's death. The SNC denounced the "murder" of Jacquier, saying it was a "dangerous sign that the authorities have decided to physically liquidate journalists in an attempt to silence neutral and independent media." Anti-government activists in Homs also said the authorities had orchestrated the attack, and Wissam Tarif, an Arab campaigner with international activist non-governmental organization Avaaz, undermined the government's claims. "The journalists were attacked in a heavily militarized regime stronghold. It would be hugely difficult for any armed opposition to penetrate the area and launch such a deadly attack," he said. Tarif also said the incident was an "unacceptable breach of the Arab League protocol", to which Syria had committed itself and which required journalists to have freedom to report across Syria. "The regime has denied journalists free access to the country, forcing them to join press tours organized by the ministry of information and chaperoned closely by regime minders," he said. Arab League mission reports, however, indicated that Jacquier was killed by mortar shells fired by opposition forces.

On 22 January, two Swiss journalists blamed Syrian authorities for the death of Jacquier. Patrick Vallelian and Sid Ahmed Hammouche told the Associated Press that they believed the attack was part of an elaborate trap set up by Syrian authorities. The two Swiss reporters and Jacquier were part of a group of foreign journalists being escorted through Homs by Syrian soldiers and intelligence officials. Vallelian and Hammouche claimed the soldiers appeared to know in advance that the attack was going to happen.

=== February–March 2012 rebel assaults and army offensive ===
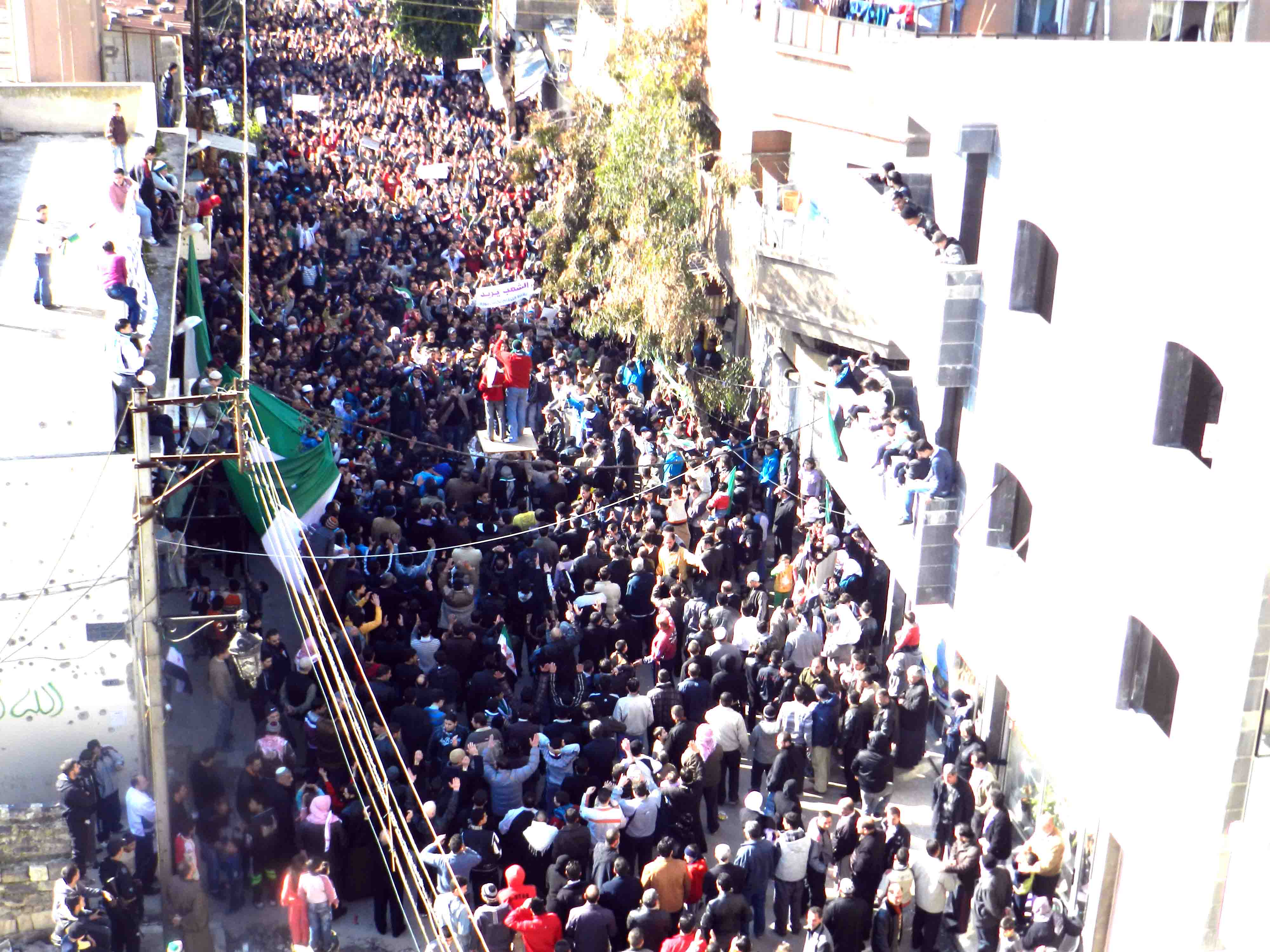
Anti-government protest in the Bab Dreeb district of Homs, 3 February 2012

In late January-early February, activists reported that the Syrian army killed eight civilians and that 15 government soldiers were killed by defectors; the Syrian army also entered the al-Adawiya district, driving out the Free Syrian Army rebels. The Al-Watan newspaper reported that 37 rebel fighters were killed in the fighting. Video footage was posted online reportedly showing a captured government BMP-1 being used by FSA forces; it bore two rebel flags and was seen firing with armed men in civilian clothes taking cover behind it.

On 1 February 2012, the Free Syrian Army assaulted the government-controlled Bab Dreeb district, which was used as a staging area for Syrian army raids and for shelling other districts such as Karm al-Zeitoun. A France 24 journalist on the ground saw at least four FSA vehicles moving towards the front line. Video obtained by France 24 later showed the FSA overrunning the former military base in the district. At least four Syrian soldiers were killed in the assault. The next day, it appeared that another military checkpoint fell to the FSA.

==== Army attack ====
Districts listed on the map saw fighting or shelling during February 2012

Following the killing of ten Syrian Army soldiers at a checkpoint and the capture of 19 by FSA fighters on the night of 3 February and into the early hours of 4 February–on the 30th anniversary of the 1982 Hama massacre–government forces began an artillery bombardment of Homs, particularly the Khaldieh neighborhood, which opposition activists claimed led to over 200 deaths. Activists posted many videos of burning buildings and dead bodies that they claimed occurred in Homs. Some footage showed buildings reduced to rubble from shelling. According to SOHR, after more than two hours, Peter Beaumont and Syrian citizen journalist Omar Shakir tweeted that the Syrian Army had not entered the district. The FSA vowed to fight back with intense operations against the governments' forces and claimed to have destroyed an air intelligence building in the city. In addition to the civilian deaths, 14 soldiers and five army defectors were also killed in the shelling and fighting, according to SOHR.

The Syrian National Council claimed 416 residents were killed in the massive shelling. They also cited residents as saying at least 36 houses were completely destroyed with families still inside. An Al Arabiya correspondent in Homs said the district hospital was destroyed and claimed that at least 337 people had been killed and over 1,600 people were injured in the shelling. However, the SNC and Al Arabiya figures were not independently confirmed and several international media outlets, including Reuters, France 24, BBC and CNN still reported the death toll of around 200. The Local Coordination Committees also initially claimed that the death toll was more than 200 people, saying that they were working to confirm the number of deaths. They later revised their figures with a confirmation of 55 deaths. On 5 February, the LCC stated that 181 people had been killed. At least 30 buildings, including a hospital, were destroyed or severely damaged in the shelling.

On 6 February, there were reports of new shelling in the rebel-held Baba Amr district in which 12-50 people were killed, according to varying activists. Some local residents said that 150 armored vehicles were on the outskirts of the district. On 8 February, activists reported an unverified death toll of 48 people killed. They also reported that tanks had entered the al-Inshaat neighborhood. In the al-Bayadah quarter of the city, a car bomb killed several people, with civilians and security forces being among the casualties. On 9 February, activists said 93 people were killed in Homs by artillery shelling. Another group of activists gave a lower death toll of 57 dead. On 10 February, an FSA spokesman reported that Ahmed Jumrek, an FSA colonel, died in the shelling along with four other rebel fighters. Activists stated that Syrian Army tanks stationed in Inshaat were firing on Baba Amr from a bridge. They also reported that soldiers were damaging stores and cars while conducting a house-to-house sweeping operation. On 11 February, activists reported that Army tanks began moving from the Inshaat quarter to the edge of the Baba Amr district.

It was reported on 12 February that an FSA fighter had told British journalist Paul Wood that they summarily executed 11 prisoners under the pretext that they were shabiha, following an ambush of armored vehicles in December 2011, during which eight other soldiers were killed. The fighter also showed video, which he claimed was from one of the alleged shabiha prisoners' cellphones, showing the beheading of captured rebels. On 14 February, an FSA commander told reporters that his men had repelled a ground assault on Baba Amr, saying that four Army tanks had been destroyed when they tried to enter, although his claims could not be verified.

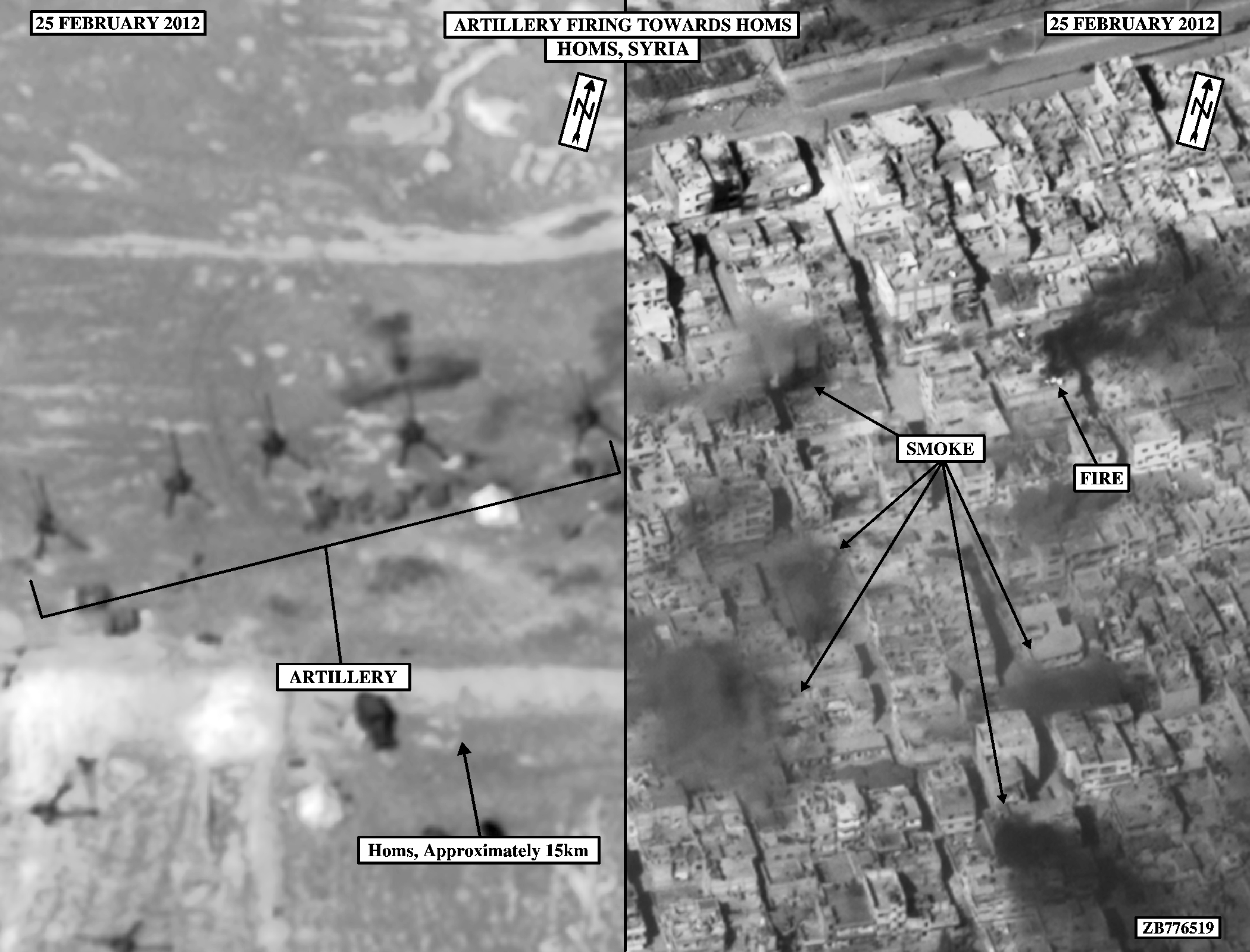
Artillery firing on Homs (left) and smoke subsequently rising from shelled buildings (right), 25 February 2012

On 22 February 2012, American journalist Marie Colvin and French photographer Rémi Ochlik were killed when a rocket hit their safe house. Another photographer, Paul Conroy, and French journalist Edith Bouvier of Le Figaro were also injured during the attack. The day before her death, Colvin had spoken to CNN and others of the "absolutely sickening" indiscriminate attacks on civilians by government forces. It was speculated that the journalists were targeted. The editor of The Sunday Times also said he believed Colvin had been targeted. French president Nicolas Sarkozy described the killing as "assassination".

In mid-February, seven civilian activists were found executed by the Syrian government because they had been collaborating with the Avaaz activist NGO; the group had been delivering medical aid to Homs. Two others, including a foreigner, remained missing. The foreigner was a paramedic with the group when Avaaz did not reveal his name or nationality, but alerted the country's embassy. "They carried a respirator and medicines," an Avaaz activist said about the activists. After losing contact with them, a member of the network "found seven of them shot dead, with hands tied behind their backs ... just before the entrance to Baba Amr," the activist told AFP. "Those were civilian activists, unpaid volunteers," he said, accusing the "Shabiha armed forces" of killing the men whose ages ranged between 16 and 24.

On 27 February, the SOHR reported that 68 corpses were found between the villages of Ram al-Enz and Ghajariyeh and were taken to the central hospital of Homs. The wounds showed that some of the dead were shot while others were killed by cutting weapons. The LCC reported that 64 dead bodies were found, all adult men. These two sources hypothesized that the victims were civilians who tried to flee the battle in Homs and were then killed by a pro-government militia. However, other activists reported another version of the killings, saying that the victims were Alawites, from the same sect as the president. The bodies were recovered in pro-government areas.

The injured British photo-journalist, Paul Conroy, was successfully smuggled into Lebanon by the FSA's Farouq Brigades and volunteers who were local Baba Amr activists. Avaaz claimed that this rescue attempt cost the lives of between 13 and 23 volunteers, out of the 35 that Avaaz sent, though this claim was later disputed by Paul Conroy in his 2013 book Under the Wire. Conroy states that Avaaz charged reporters Rémi Ochlik and Edith Bouvier $3000 to enter Baba Amr a week prior, using the same route and tunnel that he used to escape. Avaaz's Ricken Patel later put the volunteer death toll at 23 deaths out of 50 people.

==== Fall of Baba Amr ====
On 28 February 2012, reinforcements from the 4th Armoured Division encircled Homs and managed to completely seal off the besieged city, notably by destroying a tunnel. On the morning of 29 February, amid heavy shelling, an activist claimed that the Syrian Army had launched a ground assault with infantry on the embattled Baba Amr district. A Syrian official speaking on condition of anonymity appeared to confirm that security forces were advancing on Baba Amr to clear it of rebel fighters and suggested that the operation would be over in a matter of hours. However, as more reports emerged in the late afternoon, it seemed that a ground operation had not taken place after all, with The Guardian's Middle East correspondent Martin Chulov, his colleague Peter Beaumont, and Syrian self-described citizen journalist Omar Shakir all tweeting that the Army had not entered the district. Meanwhile, it was reported that some FSA leaders had already escaped Baba Amr despite the FSA's Farouq Brigades stating they would fight to the last man.

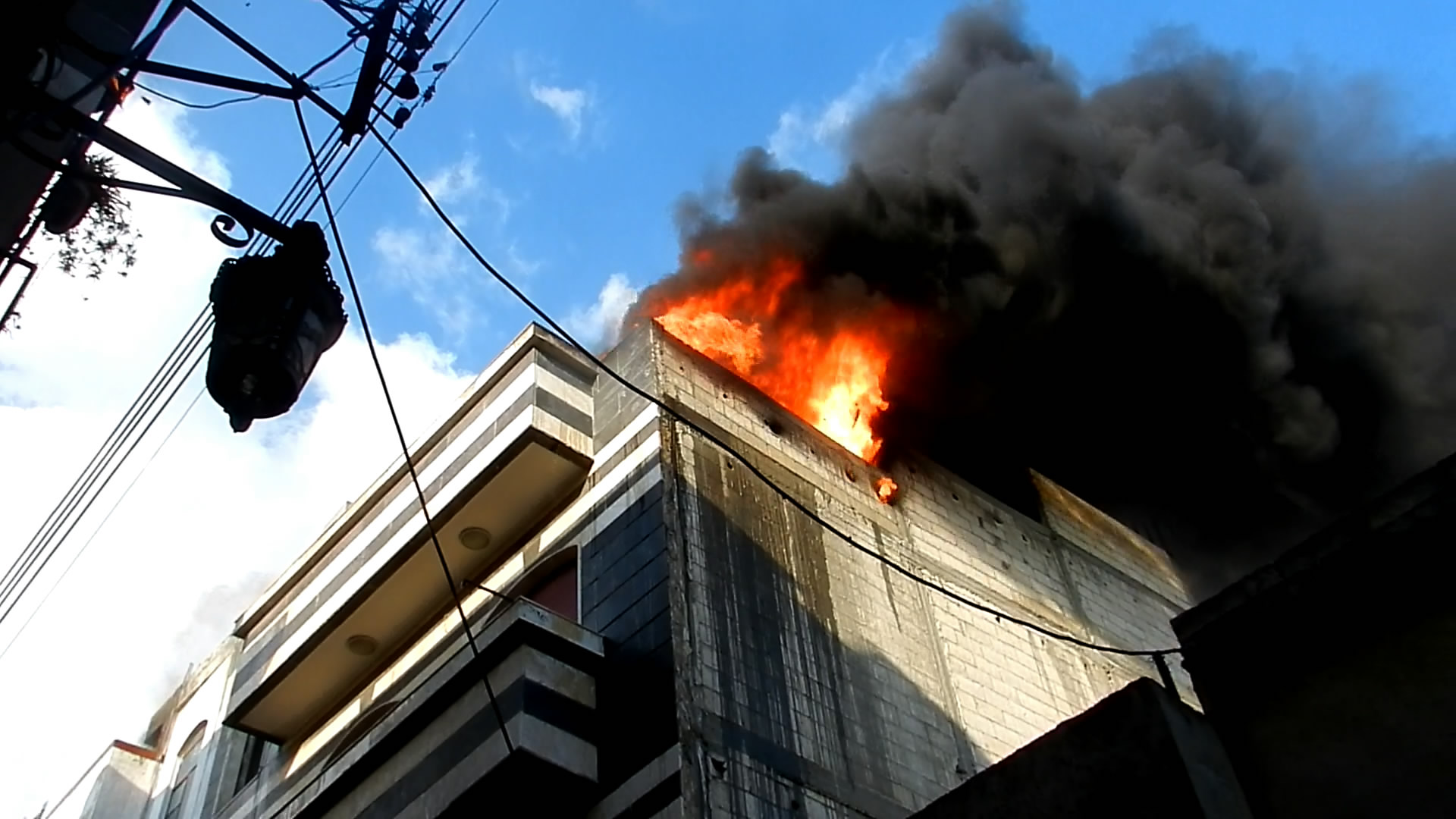
A burning house in Homs after Syrian Army bombardment.

On the morning of 1 March, the situation in Baba Amr was unclear due to a total information blackout; the Revolutionary Council of Homs said they had no news from the district. Avaaz reported that two opposition groups had said that the Syrian Army had not taken the quarter, while another group claimed the army had taken a portion of it.

Later in the day, a Syrian official said the Syrian Army had taken full control of Baba Amr. Rebel leaders reported that they pulled out of the district and that some fighters stayed behind to cover the retreat. During their retreat, 17 rebels were captured by the military and executed where they were. The United Nations Human Rights Council said it had received reports of executions in Homs while Avaaz claimed the executed were civilians and that they were beheaded, but this was not confirmed by other sources. Aid groups said they had received the approval from the army to deliver the needed supplies and treatments to citizens but were then prevented by soldiers, amid suspicions it was to cover up crimes they were in process of committing. The International Committee of the Red Cross reported it had been denied access to Baba Amr, calling it "unacceptable". During the fall of the district, rebels smuggled French journalists Edith Bouvier and William Daniels–the last who remained in the city–into Lebanon in an operation that cost the lives of six FSA members. An FSA commander later stated that out of 250 rebel fighters defending the district, 114 were killed in the fighting. FSA commander Riad al-Asaad vowed to continue to fight until the fall of the regime and claimed that his fighters had to leave due to the poor conditions of the civilians.

The Syrian Army's capture of the Baba Amr stronghold provoked multiple reactions from analysts and officials. Taleb Ibrahim, an analyst close to the Syrian government, commented that it was the beginning of the end of Homs' armed opposition. Ayham Kamel, a Middle East analyst, observed that the Syrian Army used the capture of Baba Amr to send the message that it was still the dominant force on the battlefield, noting that the stronghold was a significant base for the organization and weapons supply hub for the rebels. British journalist Paul Conroy, who escaped the city a few days prior, described the situation as an "indiscriminate massacre" and "slaughter" and compared the siege to the Battle of Grozny.

Fleeing residents spoke of the atrocities in the city. Refugees said that government loyalists had rounded up 36 men and boys in Baba Amr and killed them while other witnesses said that loyalists had been cutting the throats of prisoners. Meanwhile, soldiers from an elite army division were defecting because they had received orders to shoot everything, military and civilian alike, and one defector said he witnessed his commander executing an elderly man. British journalist Paul Wood returned to Homs in the days following the fall Baba Amr, reporting that he encountered many groups of women and children, without men, who told stories of raids and of massacres and that residents were terrified of government reprisals. On 5 March, Channel 4 News showed film from the military hospital in Homs showing evidence of torture and abuse among injured civilians, including evidence of electrocutions, leg breaking, beatings with whips and electrical cables, being shackled to beds, penises tied to prevent urination, and gangrene left untreated by antibiotics. Baba Amr residents were angry about the FSA's decision to withdraw; one resident called the rebels cowards and argued that if they always planned to withdraw then they should have done so immediately and not after a month-long siege. The rebels had retreated to a village just outside of Homs.

The Al-Watan newspaper reported that bodies of foreigners were found, including the body of a European, who allegedly carried the passport of Spanish journalist Javier Espinosa; the Syrian government claimed he "was suspected of commanding a group of rebels". An FSA commander stated that five Libyans had been killed among the rebels during the city's siege.

During a visit on 7 March, UN humanitarian chief Valerie Amos said Homs had been "completely devastated" in the fighting and said she still heard gunfire while there. Amos was also reportedly stopped from going into areas in Homs still held by the opposition even after Syria's foreign minister had told her she could go to any part of the country.

=== Second Karm al-Zeitoun massacre ===
On 9 March 2012, the Syrian Army–supported by 30 tanks–entered the quarter of Karm al-Zeitoun and reportedly massacred 21 women and 26 children in the district, some of whom had their throats slit, according to activists. The opposition claimed that the main perpetrators behind the killings were paramilitary shabiha militiamen. Syrian opposition activist and citizen journalist Hadi al-Abdullah said some of the children "had been hit with blunt objects on their head, one little girl was mutilated and some women were raped before being killed"; the bodies of the victims were recorded on video. The Syrian government acknowledged that the massacre had taken place, but claimed that "armed gangs" in the district killed them. The Syrian National Council called for an emergency UN Security Council meeting to discuss the massacre, which it said took place on 11 March.

On 13 March, opposition activists posted video online purporting to show the army shelling Karm al-Zeitoun.

=== March–May 2012 clashes and UN ceasefire ===
Situation in Homs, mid-March 2012

On 20 March, a new round of shelling struck the opposition-held neighborhoods of al-Khalidiya, Qussor, and al-Bayadah in northern Homs and continued into the next day, reportedly killing 14 people. The LCC stated that another 40 people were killed on the second day of the bombardment, including 25 in Khalidiya. There were reports that the military also entered Khalidiya.

On 24 March, most rebel forces and a number of civilians retreated from the Bab al-Sbaa district under intense shelling as the military moved in. However, activists reported the district was still under bombardment of heavy shelling as of 26 March, though the FSA presence in the district was small and inconsequential. Another activist later confirmed the capture of the district.

On 2 April, about 40 FSA militants captured the Homs National Hospital in Juret al-Shayah district. They found 78 corpses "stacked in a hospital refrigerator". In renewed fighting on 8 April, mortars were described as falling "like rain" on Khalidiya by an activist. A makeshift hospital was allegedly stacked with 40 bodies which the opposition were desperately trying to keep cool with fans. An activist said they may have to be buried "in public gardens" due to a lack of other feasible options.

On the morning of 14 April, major shelling occurred in the districts of Juret al-Shayah and al-Qarabis, violating Kofi Annan's UN-led truce that was implemented the same day. On 15 April, the Syrian Army was reported to be shelling the neighborhood of al-Waer from the nearby military academy. SANA also reported that "terrorists" killed 12 civilians in the pro-Assad, predominantly Alawite neighborhood of al-Zahra in what appeared to be an FSA attack. On 16 April, al-Khalidiya was heavily shelled from three sides while the Army stormed al-Bayada and took control of half of it. They also tried to storm Juret al-Shayah and al-Qarabis, but were repelled by the FSA. Sky News correspondent Tim Marshall, reporting from within the Khalidiya district, claimed that despite recent Army advances, the FSA still controlled large areas of the city and that hundreds of civilians still lived in Khalidiya despite heavy government artillery shelling and sniper activity. The Homs National Hospital in Juret al-Shayah had also reportedly been badly damaged by shelling. According to Marshall, many streets had sheets of tarpaulin hung from one side to the other and concrete walls had been erected to prevent Army snipers from having a clear line of sight into Khalidiya; people had to sprint across smaller streets to avoid sniper fire. The FSA commander in Homs, Abdul Razzaq Tlass, noted the sniper activity as a violation of the UN ceasefire, even though the UN said that neither side was completely abiding by the ceasefire rules.

On 20 April, a rebel leader stated that 2,000 Farouq Brigades fighters had been killed in Homs province since August 2011. By this point, there were talks among the rebels in Qusayr, where most of the surviving Baba Amr rebels fled, of Homs being abandoned entirely.

By late April, UN military observers noted a rare lull in the fighting in Homs and by early May, military offensive operations in the city had ceased, although sporadic street fighting and shelling continued. The government controlled most of Homs, with the rebels holding onto 15 to 20 percent of the city, with a similar percentage of territory still being contested. In May, the Armenian Church reported that its church in the Hamida district of Homs had been seized by rebels, who then set up a hospital inside the church's Isahakyan school.

On 24 May, a UN panel reported that both the Syrian military and opposition militants had committed a number of human rights violations during the siege thus far. The UN observed that "state security forces continued to use lethal force against anti-government demonstrations in Idlib, Homs, Aleppo, Hama, Damascus" and that "too often civilians bore the brunt of the violence" while the FSA was also responsible for the torture and execution of a number of captured soldiers. One defector belonging to the Farouq Brigades stated that they executed government soldiers, after they confessed under torture, to crimes against civilians. Among those killed were allegedly three Iranian snipers. In the Jabal Zawiya and Deir Sinbal areas of Syria, makeshift prisons were reportedly set up by the FSA for captured soldiers. The sources for the panel's report included eyewitness accounts from FSA fighters who were involved in the killings.

On 25 May, a massacre occurred in the town of Taldou in the Houla region near Homs, in which 108 people were killed and 300 injured. The UN would later conclude that shabiha militiamen and Syrian soldiers were the perpetrators. On 26 May, British foreign secretary William Hague said Britain would co-ordinate a "strong response" to the Houla massacre and a UN Security Council statement, approved also by Russia and China, condemned the killings, saying it was "the result of government artillery and tank shellings on a civilian neighbourhood." The government's alleged use of heavy weapons in civilian areas was condemned.

On 28 May, Bassel Shehadeh, a young Syrian filmmaker who had filmed Homs during the conflict and had appeared on a show discussing the army's siege of the city, was killed in Homs after being fired upon by pro-government forces.

On 30 May, opposition video allegedly showed that the military had recommenced shelling of the city.

=== June–July 2012 army offensive ===
On 6 June, a CNN report showed Cairo St. (Al-Qahira St.) being a frontline between the FSA who controlled the district of al-Kalidiya and the Syrian government who controlled the district of al-Bayada. Several of the FSA fighters were former civilians and some were army defectors. The video showed them coordinating via radio and had made holes connecting one building to the next so they would not have to use the open streets.

On 8 June 2012, it was reported that shelling had picked up in the FSA-held al-Kalidiyah, at a rate of 10 shells per minute. Following the shelling, the Syrian Army made an attempt to storm the district.

On 9 June, the Syrian Army stormed the rebel-held neighborhood of al-Ghouta and started conducting raids. Shelling was reported in several parts of the city during which 25 people died, including the mayor of the rebel-held neighborhood of al-Khalidiyah, which had been under heavy bombardment since the day before. With the capture of al-Ghouta the Army had completely encircled the city's rebel-held areas and cut them off from the outside world.

Early on 10 June, rebels captured an Air Force missile base north of Homs, with the help of 22 soldiers from the unit stationed there. They looted a number of assault rifles and rocket-propelled-grenades and threatened to fire the missiles at the presidential palace in Damascus if president al-Assad did not surrender. However, soon after, government artillery hit the base and an Army counter-attack recaptured it. The rebels were not able to take with them the large and heavy SA-2 surface-to-air missiles, which were fixed to the launchers. A satellite imagery provider showed the al-Ghanto base in flames following the artillery strikes. Opposition activists also reported a more intensified campaign of bombardment of Homs.

On 12 June, residents of the rebel-held neighborhood of al-Khalidiyah told Al Jazeera English that they had been trapped in their homes for three days with no electricity or water. Other neighborhoods were targeted by shelling as well. In the district of Bab Amr, which had been retaken by the Army in early March, videos appeared showing two government tanks getting blown up at the Kafar Aya checkpoint, one of the largest in the district. Local FSA units reportedly had relaunched attacks in the neighbourhood to decrease the pressure on al-Khalidiyah and other areas which were being shelled.

On 15 June, more fighting erupted with the Army reportedly shelling, among other rebel-held districts, Baba Amr. The FSA Baba Amr brigade claimed to have taken control over a checkpoint leading to the city two days before. The FSA stated their forces made an attempt to reclaim the Baba Amr district and had got to the entrance of the neighbourhood, but were repelled by Army helicopters.

Then, on 17 June, after intense fighting with government troops at the edge of Baba Amr, opposition activists claimed that rebel fighters reclaimed a large part of the area. However, this was not independently confirmed. The same day, an activist stated that the Army stepped up its offensive on the city, shelling neighbourhoods systematically. It was reported that the Shabiha took over all the city's hospitals, thus dozens of wounded were without treatment, and that the Army had cut each of Homs's districts from each other. An opposition campaigner claimed that "85% of Homs is now under shelling or bombardment with mortar rounds and heavy machine guns." The shelling was primarily hitting the remaining rebel-held areas in the neighborhoods of Old Homs, al-Khalidiya, Jourat al-Shayyah, Qarabis and al-Bayada.

The Syrian opposition said that, at that point, 30,000 soldiers and pro-government militiamen had amassed at the city. The SNC claimed there was a "looming massacre" approaching by claiming that the government was "getting ready to carry out a savage attack that might massacre the city's remaining residents."

On 19 June, widespread clashes around Baba Amr were reportedly continuing and black smoke was seen rising from the area after an oil pipeline was said to have been destroyed in the fighting.

Around 20 June, rebels launched a full-out offensive on Baba Amr district after rebels reportedly drove hundreds of soldiers from a pair of bases in the district. As a response, the military started using helicopter gunships in the city for the first time while rebel fighters were still holding out against military assaults on districts in Old Homs.

By this time, the city's remaining Christians were trapped by the fighting in the rebel-held districts of Hamidiyeh and Bustan Diwan. A fourth attempt at a negotiated ceasefire, to evacuate the trapped civilians, was underway. However, the chief negotiator felt hopeless. He said that in past attempts the Army had agreed to a two-hour truce to allow the mediators to evacuate the besieged people but they were blocked by the rebels. This was confirmed by at least on Homs resident, who stated that he feared the rebels wanted to keep the Christians trapped in the city as a bargaining chip while the Army's bombardment and ground attacks on Homs intensified. Those who managed to sneak out settled in an area outside the city, dubbed as Valley of the Christians.

On 28 June, SANA claimed a number of violent incidents around Homs. In one, a group of rebels reportedly opened fire and killed a professor of al-Baath University in Homs. She was killed along with her mother, father and three of her sister's children. Soon after, security forces clashed with the group killing 10 rebels and wounding 20. Two of the dead were reportedly Arabs of foreign nationalities. At the same time, a security forces raid in the Taldaw suburb killed one rebel and seized a weapons cache. Also, the leader of a rebel group, Khaled al-Hamad, known as Abu Sakar, was killed during security operations along with a number of his fighters.

On 29 June, according to SANA, another rebel group leader was killed during fighting in the Joret al-Shayyah quarter of Homs. Other rebels were killed when an explosive device exploded in their weapons cache.

On 2 July, the rebel-held districts of Joret al-Shayyah, al-Khalidiyah and Old City came under sustained Army shelling.

On 3 July, the military made an attempt to storm Joret al-Shayyah.

On 5 July, the 29th day of the new military offensive, heavy artillery shelling continued to strike the Joret al-Shayyah neighborhood. Fighting was also underway in the Al Sultania district and locals had abandoned the Baba Amr district which was reportedly completely destroyed.

On 9 July, a new round of artillery fire hit Joret al-Shayyah, al-Khalidiyah and Old City and fighting was continuing in Al Sultania. Seven soldiers were killed in the clashes.

On 11 July, Joret al-Shayyah was still being shelled and the district of Qarabees was also hit.

=== Stalemate ===
On 21 July 2012, a riot began at the central prison's old building. Some guards defected and supported the rioters there. Security forces, however, surrounded the prison and clashed with prisoners leaving 3–4 people dead. Activists said between 5,000 and 6,000 prisoners were in Homs Central Prison and feared a massacre. Later, it was reported that the mutiny had been crushed.

On 29 July, SANA claimed that government troops killed 16 foreign rebel fighters and captured others in the city. The government-run news agency further alleged that a rebel leader, Hamza al-Tesh, was killed in al-Khalidya the following day.

On 4 August, state radio claimed that 40 rebel fighters were killed while others were wounded during a military operation in the al-Hamidieh district. The next day, SANA claimed that dozens of rebels were killed and wounded when their ammunition depot exploded in the Jouret Ashayah district.

On 7 August 16 civilians, mostly Alawites and Christians, were killed by rebel forces. The same day, SANA claimed that seven rebels were killed during clashes.

On 12 August, the military launched an incursion into the al-Shamas neighborhood and detained 350 people, mostly young men of military age. 10 of those detained were reportedly executed with the fate of the other 340 unknown. The opposition SNC claimed the executed men were civilians, while the activist group SOHR confirmed that people were detained but made no mention of executions. Three children on a minibus were killed as they tried to flee with their parents from the Shamas district during the military operation. After the operation, a Brigadier General defected, stating that the Shamas neighbourhood had no FSA elements and that the Shabiha were led by Iranian military advisors during the operation. The Syrian newspaper Watan, reported that 40 rebels were killed and 70 captured during operations in al-Shamas. The same day, the Army launched an operation in al-Hamidyeh, killing tens of rebels in two hideouts and destroying an ammunition dump. The Army also arrested 26 people in Tabliseh, state media reported.

On 13 August, a sergeant in the special forces who had defected claimed that Alawite officers ordered the rape of teenage girls in Homs, who would be shot afterwards. The defected sergeant further said that soldiers who refused were shot by the Army.

On 3 September, a colonel from the FSA announced the formation of a 'Revolutionary Military Council' in Homs, in a video uploaded to YouTube. In the video, Colonel Fatih Fahd Hasoon announced the formation of the council to unify all FSA brigades in the central Syrian province. He vowed the council would "free Syria from the brutal gangs of Assad's regime," and named himself as its leader.

On 5 September, Breaking News Network reported that 40 rebels where killed during clashes with the Syrian Army in Bab Hud neighborhood, 32 more rebels were killed in a qualitative operation, Sham media reported.

=== October 2012 army offensive ===
On 5 October 2012, Homs experienced its worst bombardment in months when warplanes, tanks and artillery fired missiles and mortars at rebel controlled neighborhoods, including Old Homs, Khaldiya, Qusour and Jouret el-Shayah.

On 8 October, government forces advanced into the rebel-held Khalidiya district amid heavy fighting and what was described as the most vicious attack by the Army yet. The advance was confirmed by the rebels who stated they were forced to retreat due to the artillery fire destroying several buildings that were being used by the opposition fighters as a barrier between them and the military.

By October 2012, Hezbollah openly operated in the area of the neighbouring city of al-Qusayr, in conjunction with Syrian military forces. A military source said in October that the Army launched a broad offensive to take control of all remaining Homs quarters and the neighbouring city of Al Qusayr as well. The source expected the operation to take one week to be completed. However, Al Qusayr remained in the hands of rebels, who reported to have killed 60 Hezbollah fighters in the city. Another 16 were captured in the Sayida Zeinab and Qabboun districts of Damascus, according to senior FSA members.

A Homs resident living in a rebel-held neighbourhood said that the shelling was very heavy. He added that the Syrian army was currently controlling 75% of the city and that the rest could fall at any moment because of the strength of the Army attack.

On 9 October, a resident living in rebel-controlled Hamidiya district described the Syrian army offensive as psychological warfare, saying that the Syrian army made little to no gains in Old Homs districts, being repeatedly repelled by rebel forces. This was in contrast with an opposition activist's confirmation that the army had "stormed part of Khaldiyeh" and the reported rebel retreat the previous day within the district, which was confirmed by rebel fighters. Also, the Army reported continued advances in the area, where they were reportedly pursuing rebel remnants.

On 10 October, the pro-government "Al Watan" newspaper said that the Syrian army controlled all of Homs except for a few neighborhoods still being held by the rebels. The Syrian Observatory for Human Rights said in an email that the Syrian army renewed shelling of the Khalidiya, Jouret Shiyah and Old Homs neighborhoods. Opposition activist Abu Bilal al-Homsi said via "Skype" to "AFP", from Old Homs, "We are surrounded completely, we have no outlet." He also called on non-governmental organizations to send aid, pointing out that "the hospitals overwhelmed with the wounded who need surgery and should be evacuated." Activists rejected Government claims about districts in the city of Homs and an FSA colonel pointed out that the Government hadn't seized control of any districts but "they are advancing in some districts and retreating in others." he stressted that "al-Assad's forces are able to do nothing more than storm the entrance of a district and then immediately withdraw, despite the magnitude of the destruction they are causing."

On 12 October, the Syrian military launched another series of intense aerial and artillery bombardments on Homs and its surrounding towns. Khalidiya was especially hit hard, a day after the Army suffered heavy losses in an attempt to capture the district. Opposition activists claimed 50 soldiers and militiamen were killed.

On 13 October, the military reported killing 25 rebels in the Bab al-Hood district.

On 14 October, rebels were advancing towards the Southern Bab Amr district. An opposition spokesman said that "Everyday there are firefights between the regime and the FSA (Free Syria Army) in the Sultaniya neighborhood, The FSA has a lot of battalions in Homs. There are many dead from both the regime and the FSA." He added that "very few civilians remain in the neighborhoods around Homs." There was intense fighting in the Bab Hud and Bab al-Turkman districts with an unknown number of people on both sides being killed.

By late October, a Syrian army officer in Homs estimated that 1,500-2,000 rebels were left inside the Old City district. At this time, government troops cleared the Bab al-Sebaa area by capturing a school that was being used as a rebel stronghold.

=== December 2012 ===
By mid-December 2012, the military had regained control of almost all of Homs, except the Old City and Khalidiya district, where rebels were still holding out under siege by the Army. The rebels continued to exchange sniper and mortar fire with government forces, but for the most part the city was calm and most of the city shops and markets were open and traffic was flowing freely. One bus driver stated "Homs is now safer than Damascus". One of a few areas where life still had not gone back to a full normal was the Armenian area, which reportedly was hit by several shells fired by the rebels from the Old City. On one occasion, a four-story building collapsed, killing five people and injuring 37 others. Fighter jets continued to bomb the rebel-held areas and Sky News described the scene in rebel-held areas and its frontlines as brutal low-tech guerrilla war.

On 23 December, opposition activists claimed that the Syrian army launched bombs containing poisonous gas against rebel positions in the Bayada district, and that six or seven rebels were killed from it with up to 70 others hurt. Residents said that they did not know the nature of the gas. The claim of the nerve agent use was supported by Maj-Gen Abdoul-Aziz Jassius al-Shallal, the former chief of the Syrian military police, who had defected to the opposition. A U.S. official told Danger Room that, based on the video of the victims, "It just doesn't jibe with chemical weapons". The Israeli vice prime minister, Moshe Ya'alon, also voiced doubt at the rebel claims, citing the lack of corroboration to them.

On 24 December, the Syrian Army attacked the rebel-held district of Deir Baalba and by 29 December, after several days of heavy fighting, the military had captured the district as rebel forces retreated from the area. The neighborhood had been under siege for months. With the loss of Deir Baalba, rebel forces were left only with Khalidiya and the Old City as the last remaining neighborhoods under their control. The next day, the military launched barrages of rockets into the remaining rebel-held neighborhoods.

Following the capture of the district, opposition activists made claims that up to 150–220 people were rounded up by the military, taken to a petrochemical university and executed, with their bodies being burned or taken away. The opposition Shaam News Network reported that about 150 charred bodies were found in the Deir Baalba neighborhood. However, there was no independent verification of the claims and one opposition activist was able to count only 27 bodies.

=== January–February 2013 army offensive and rebel counter-offensive ===
On 15 January 2013, government troops overran the village of Basatin al-Hasawiya on the edge of the city. Opposition activists claimed that during the operation pro-government militiamen and soldiers massacred 106 civilians, including women and children, by shooting, stabbing or possibly burning them to death.

On 20 January, following rebel attempts to advance into new areas of Homs from the countryside, the Army launched a retaliatory offensive, to halt the rebel infiltration. Over three days, between 20 and 22 January, heavy fighting erupted in the western areas of Homs, where 130 soldiers and pro-government militiamen were killed or wounded, with 23 of them being confirmed as dead. By 25 January 120 civilians and 30–40 rebels were also reported to have been killed. Opposition activists claimed 10,000 pro-government militiamen were brought in as reinforcements from Tartous for the offensive. The Army was focusing on securing a vital a road junction on the outskirts of the city, which is on a supply line to government forces further in the interior of the country. On 26 January, more than 20 additional rebels and civilians were killed in fighting in the Jobar-Kafraya farm area on the south-western edge of Homs. A doctor from a makeshift underground hospital reported that opposition forces and civilians were surrounded. Rebels from the nearby town of Qusair were attempting to relieve the pressure on opposition forces on the western edge of Homs and in a counter-offensive two days previously managed to push back government forces slightly. However, the military continued to pound the area with artillery and air-strikes and the armed opposition had been weakened in the city after a drop in ammunition supplies in the weeks before due to a tightening of the Army siege on western areas.

At the same time, BBC News reported that in the rest of the city, which is government-controlled, a 'fragile calm' had returned.

On 14 February, the Syrian army captured the southwestern Jobar district, after rebels withdrew from the area. A week before, the military had also seized the southwestern Kafraya district.

On 20 February, rebel activists distributed video of what they claimed was the destruction in the Al-Qarabis district after they reportedly stormed it and took control.

=== March 2013 renewed army offensive and rebel counter-offensive ===
On 3 March 2013, government troops launched a major offensive into rebel-held territory in Homs, where the rebels by now had been reinforced by rebel units arriving from nearby Al-Qusayr. The neighborhoods attacked were the Old City, Jouret al-Shiah, Khaldiyeh, and Qarabees. It was reported to be the worst fighting in months as scores of dead on both sides were accounted for.

By 6 March, government forces were bombarding the Old City and Khaldiyeh for four straight days.

Situation in Homs, mid-March 2013

On 10 March, rebels infiltrated the Baba Amr area of Homs under the cover of night. The next morning, they launched an attack on government positions within the district. According to an opposition activist, Army checkpoints barely had time to realise that an attack was under way. Army troops sealed off several roads around Baba Amr and the Air force conducted air strikes on the district. The purpose of the rebel raid was reportedly to relieve pressure on the remaining rebel-held areas of the city that were still under siege by the military. At the same time, fighting was still ongoing in the rebel areas of Old Homs and Khaldiyeh, where the military was pressing its offensive.

By 12 March, heavy fighting was still ongoing in both Khaldiyeh, where government tanks were in action, and Baba Amr, which was being hit by Army rocket fire. It remained unclear how much of Baba Amr the rebels had captured or continued to hold after the latest fighting in the area. Civilians were forced to flee, as the army fired heavy machine guns into the district. The UN food agency said the renewed violence in Baba Amr has forced at least 3,000 families to leave their homes in the contested area.

On 14 March, the Syrian army reportedly shelled the Bab Hud, al-Turkman, Bab Dreib, Bab Tadmur and al-Sefsafa neighborhoods. 20 rebels and 22 soldiers were killed in the fighting.

On 25 March, the opposition group SOHR reported that the military had taken control of large parts of the neighbourhood, with clashes continuing in the district's orchards. By the next day, 26 March, SOHR confirmed the military had recaptured the whole of Baba Amr. Meanwhile, fighting was reported in the Jobar section of the city. End of March and early April 2013, government forces were only able to hold on to critical territory in Homs city due to the support of Hezbollah moving fully into the fighting.

=== Old Homs and Khalidiya separated ===
On 2 May 2013, the Syrian army, backed by Hezbollah and Iranian fighters, pushed into and regained control of the strategic Wadi al-Sayeh neighborhood. The district is located in-between the rebel-held Old Homs and Khalidiya districts, thus with its capture government forces had cut the link between those two areas and they had become completely separated and surrounded.

=== June–July 2013 army offensive and capture of Khalidiya ===
On 28 June 2013, the Army captured the town of Al-Qariatayn near Homs.

On 29 June, government troops launched an offensive on several rebel-held parts of Homs city, pounding the districts with air raids and mortar fire. "Military operations never stopped in Homs, but their pace increases according to priorities," an Army officer told AFP. The military bombardment started at nine in the morning and lasted for three hours before the Army deployed ground troops. Syrian state TV was quoted as saying the Army had "great success" in the battle for Homs, "killing many terrorists in the Khalidiya district". Fighting raged around the Khalid ibn al-Walid Mosque in Khalidiya, which had earlier caught fire. An activist in the Old City of Homs stated that the Army had "used rocket launchers for hours". He also commented that all water, phone and power had been cut off or blocked, save satellite communications. "The only thing they haven't blocked is the air we breathe" the activist reported.

On 30 June, the second day of the offensive, government forces were attacking the old covered market which is located in Old Homs. Fighting was also ongoing in the Bab Hud district of Old Homs.

On 3 July, an opposition activist stated that the fighting had become from building to building and the military was trying to take the rebel areas a block at a time. He said government forces were "cleaning" the areas of rebel fighters by firing mortar shells at buildings.

During the evening of 5 July, government forces managed for the first time to breach Khalidiya, capturing several buildings in the district after breaking the rebel's first line of defenses.

During the first two days of the offensive, according to SOHR, 32 government soldiers and militiamen had been killed, of which 24 died on the first day. Another eight government fighters were killed on 4 July. The number of rebels killed was unknown, but eight were reported killed on 5 July.

On 6 July, it was reported that the battle was swinging in favor of the Army, as rebels were running low on weapons. By this point, 60 to 70 percent of buildings in Khalidiya had been totally or partially destroyed or made uninhabitable.

On 8 July, government forces advanced into Khalidiya. According to the opposition, the Army captured 30 percent of the district, while military sources claimed that they had captured most of the neighborhood. Both sides confirmed government troops had captured areas around the Khalid ibn al-Walid Mosque. In a desperate attempt, rebels threatened they would blow themselves up along with government forces if the Army managed to enter the mosque complex.

On 10 July, government forces captured several areas in the Bab Hud district. Heavy artillery strikes continued on Khalidiya, Wadi al-Sayeh, Hamidiya, Bab Hud and Baba al-Turkman. Meanwhile, most civilians had fled Khalidiya, with only rebel fighters and their families remaining, according to an opposition activist.

By 11 July, rebel forces were preparing to retreat from the city, citing attrition of manpower and overwhelming military bombardment from government forces. Diplomats and opposition sources reported that the last opposition-held areas of Homs were set to fall within days to the Syrian army after the rebel forces decided to "sacrifice" the country's third-largest city to the government.

On 22 July, opposition activists claimed Army shelling had destroyed the historic mausoleum of a companion of the Prophet Mohammed in the Khalid ibn al-Walid Mosque.

On 24 July, it was reported that government bombardment of rebel areas had abruptly ceased "in recent days" in response to rebels firing Grad rockets at government-supporting civilian areas in other parts of the city the previous week. However, on 25 July, more artillery attacks on Khalidiya were reported.

On 26 July, government forces advanced further into Khalidiya and the district of Jouret el-Shayah. Soldiers had reached 50 meters from the Khalid ibn al-Walid Mosque. By the next day, soldiers had entered the mosque area from the eastern side and the Army captured the mosque itself. Government and Hezbollah forces had also taken control of 60 percent of Khalidiya. That night, state TV broadcast a report with footage from inside the heavily damaged mosque. The footage showed the tomb's dome knocked out and a portion of the mosque appeared to have been burned.

By 28 July, most of Khalidiya, estimated to be 70 percent, was under Army control, with fighting continuing on the northern and southern outskirts of the district. According to an Army officer, rebels were still controlling the northern part of Khalidiya. The military advances left only the Old Homs area under rebel control, where an estimated 1,000 rebel fighters remained. The next day, opposition activists confirmed 90 percent of the district had been captured by the Army, with scattered fighting continuing in the southern areas. That night, SOHR reported that the Army had taken full control of Khalidiya after capturing the Masakin al-Mu'alimin quarter.

During this time, the military blew up the last of the rebel smuggling tunnels going into Old Homs, leaving the area completely sealed off.

On 1 August, rebels launched rockets into the Wadi Dahab district of Homs, causing massive explosions at a weapons depot that killed at least 40 people and injured at least 120.

On 5 August, Syrian defence minister Fahd Jassem al-Freij met with SAA troops in the captured district of Khalidiya. The state run "SANA" news agency reported that the general conducted a tour of the area and "visited army units restoring security and stability in the neighbourhood".

=== Siege of Old Homs ===
On 21 September 2013, the report "Homs misery 'like siege of Stalingrad'" by The Australian newspaper cited a doctor on location as giving the number remaining trapped in Homs as "3000 people and 1000 are injured, many women and children." The source further described the conditions of those trapped in the city where "most buildings in the Old City district, the last rebel-held enclave, had been flattened by artillery and the remaining inhabitants were living in basements." as follows: "We have to drink from polluted wells and wash in the sewage water," the doctor said. "We eat leaves and rotten rice. We have had no electricity for 500 days."

In late September, it was reported that the Army and rebels in some villages around Homs ceased hostilities, and FSA fighters were present in government-held areas without being molested. There was, however, no discussions on lifting the siege on the Old Homs area.

On 9 October, AFP reported that "rebel shelling of one of Syria's two main oil refineries" in Homs city had set the plant on fire. According to the report, "The Homs refinery had a pre-war capacity of 5.7 million tonnes per year but Prime Minister Wael al-Halqi said earlier this month that it was running at 10 percent of that. The other main plant at Banias on the Mediterranean coast -- heartland of the Assad regime -- is still refining at 80 percent of capacity, Halqi said."

On 12 October, Asharq Al-Awsat (a Saudi-linked pan-Arab newspaper) reported upon an exclusive interview with "FSA media and political coordinator Louay Miqdad" that "the Free Syrian Army (FSA) has announced that it is prepared to abide by a "temporary truce" in Homs and Rif Dimashq with Assad forces during Eid Al-Adha in order to facilitate humanitarian access to the two governorates. However, the FSA rejected a prolonged 9-month ceasefire with the Assad regime in order to allow the Organization for the Prohibition of Chemical Weapons (OPCW) to carry out its operations overseeing the destruction of Syria's chemical weapons stockpile."

In late November, the Army began an assault on the last remaining rebel-held pockets. On the evening of 8 January 2014, a group of 60 rebels from within Old Homs attempted to break the siege of the area. Government forces ambushed them near Khalidiya leaving at least 45 rebel fighters dead in fighting that lasted into the next morning. The remaining 18 fighters were missing. After the ambush, the Army launched an assault in an attempt to push into the Matahan area of Old Homs, where 150 rebels were putting up resistance, but their attack was beaten back. However, armoured Army reinforcements were sent from Damascus towards Homs.

=== Humanitarian operation ===
On 7 February 2014, a three-day truce was signed between the Syrian government and the rebels, under the auspices of the UN to allow the evacuation of civilians from the besieged neighborhoods of Homs. The first day of the operation, 83 people were evacuated from besieged areas of the Old City.

On 8 February, both sides are accused of having broken the truce but the operation continued.

On 9 February 611 civilians out of the besieged neighborhoods: 210 women, 180 children, 91 men in age above 55, and 130 young men surrendered according to SOHR. The truce was extended of 72 hours.

On 17 February, Jeffrey White, a fellow at the Washington Institute for Near East Policy and a former senior American intelligence official, was quoted by the New York Times claiming that Assad government was conducting barrel-bomb attacks in Homs using Russian-supplied Mi-8 and Mi-17 helicopters.

By mid-March, 1,500 rebels and civilians, 100 of them wounded, were still trapped in Old Homs. They came to feel abandoned and faced only with the choices of abandoning Old Homs or making a last stand to the death. At this time, there was also talk of a truce with government forces, but without any results.

=== March–April 2014 army offensive and rebel counter-offensive ===
Situation in Homs, mid-April 2014

On 31 March 2014, government troops captured two towers in the 7th Island area in the al-Waer neighborhood, as well as several buildings in the al-Jazira al-Sab'a area of the district.

On 6 April, it was initially reported a car-bomb that the rebels were preparing exploded prematurely in Old Homs killing 29 rebel fighters and leaving dozens missing. Later, reports suggested either an ambush by government forces or a Grad missile that hit a rebel ammunition depot in the Jourat al-Shayyah area left 50–75 rebels dead, including dozens of senior officers. Among those killed was also the FSA provincial commander, Abdul Qadir al-Homsi. After the explosion, only 500–600 rebels were estimated to have remained in the Old Homs area out of 2,000 six months earlier, according to an opposition source.

On 7 April, Dutch Christian priest Frans van der Lugt was executed by an unknown gunman who stormed into his house.

On 10 April, the military launched a major offensive against the Old Homs area. On 14 April, pro-government NDF militia reinforcements arrived as government forces entered the Wadi al-Sayeh neighborhood, which lies between Jourat al-Shayyah and the Old City. By the next day, they had captured several buildings in the area. An opposition source reported the garages area between Jourat al-Shayyah and Qussour had been captured by government troops as they continued to advance. Meanwhile, rebel lines in Hamidiyah in Old Homs were tenuous as NDF forces were fighting in the outskirts of the area and advancing. Heavy artillery and mortar fire also hit the al-Waer neighborhood. According to a pro-government source, the Army had breached the rebel defense line in the Bab Houd district.

By 16 April, an estimated 300–1,000 rebel fighters had surrendered since March. Some of the remaining rebel fighters in Old Homs were getting ready for a fight to the death, preparing suicide belts for use in case the Army breaches their lines, as the opposition All4Syria news site predicted that the remaining rebel-held areas of the center of the city would fall within a week.

During this time, the Syrian Opposition Coalition issued an urgent appeal as fears of a new massacre grew.

On 18 April, a car-bomb exploded in a government-held district near a mosque killing 14 people, while Army troops captured a church in Old Homs and were continuing to advance.

On 19 April, rebels launched a counter-offensive, which started with a suicide car-bomb attack on an Army checkpoint at the entrance of the government-held Jeb al-Jandali neighbourhood. Right before the attack, which killed five soldiers, other soldiers at the checkpoint defected and abandoned their positions. By the next day, opposition forces captured several buildings in the Jeb al-Jandali area. Two of the buildings that were captured were the Al Jala'a swimming pool and a school which government forces attempted to recapture during the day.

By 22 April, government troops retook full control of the Jeb al-Jandali neighborhood. At this time, dozens of rebel fighters in Old Homs were trying to surrender, while others wanted to make a last stand and were sending suicide bombers against districts under government control, primarily the ones with an Alawite majority. At least five such bombings during the month killed more than 60 people. Fighters were also turning on comrades they suspected of a desire to desert, pushing them into battle. According to an opposition activist: "We expect Homs to fall. In the next few days, it could be under the regime's control."

On 29 April, a double rebel car-bomb attack in the Abbasiyeh neighbourhood of the government-held Zahra district left 168 people dead. Among those killed were 147 civilians, including 46 children, and 12 pro-government fighters. Nine fatalities were unidentified.

=== Rebel retreat from Homs ===
On 2 May 2014, a ceasefire agreement had been reached, under which the remaining 1,000 rebel fighters would be allowed to leave Homs and head to the rebel-controlled countryside north of the city. The evacuation was scheduled for the next day. A matter of dispute remained in the agreement on whether the rebel-held al-Waer district, which is not connected to Old Homs, would be included in the deal.

On 3 May, talks on the rebel withdrawal from Homs entered their final phase. According to the provincial governor, the deal "will be applied first in the Old City, then in Waer. The goal is to reach a peaceful solution that brings back security and government institutions."

On 4 May, talks entered the implementation phase. Under the agreement, relief would be allowed into two Shiite pro-government towns in the northern province of Aleppo besieged by rebels. Also, Iranian and Lebanese prisoners held by the rebels would be released.

On 7 May, the evacuation of rebels from Homs started with two buses transporting the first group of fighters toward rebel-held areas of northern Homs province. In all, more than 960 rebels were evacuated during the day, with another 250 scheduled to be transported out the next day.

On 8 May, the final batch of 270 rebel fighters was expected to leave the city. However, rebels in Aleppo province blocked aid convoys that were supposed to bring food and medical supplies to two besieged government-held Shiite towns per the established agreement. Due to the failure of the rebels to uphold their side of the agreement, government forces blocked the remaining rebels in Old Homs from leaving. The convoys were not allowed to enter the towns the previous day as well by the al-Qaeda-linked al-Nusra Front.

During the afternoon of 9 May, the last of the rebels retreated from Homs after the aid convoys were allowed to enter the Shiite towns. Shortly after, hundreds of residents of Old Homs started to return to the area.

== Siege of al-Waer neighbourhood ==
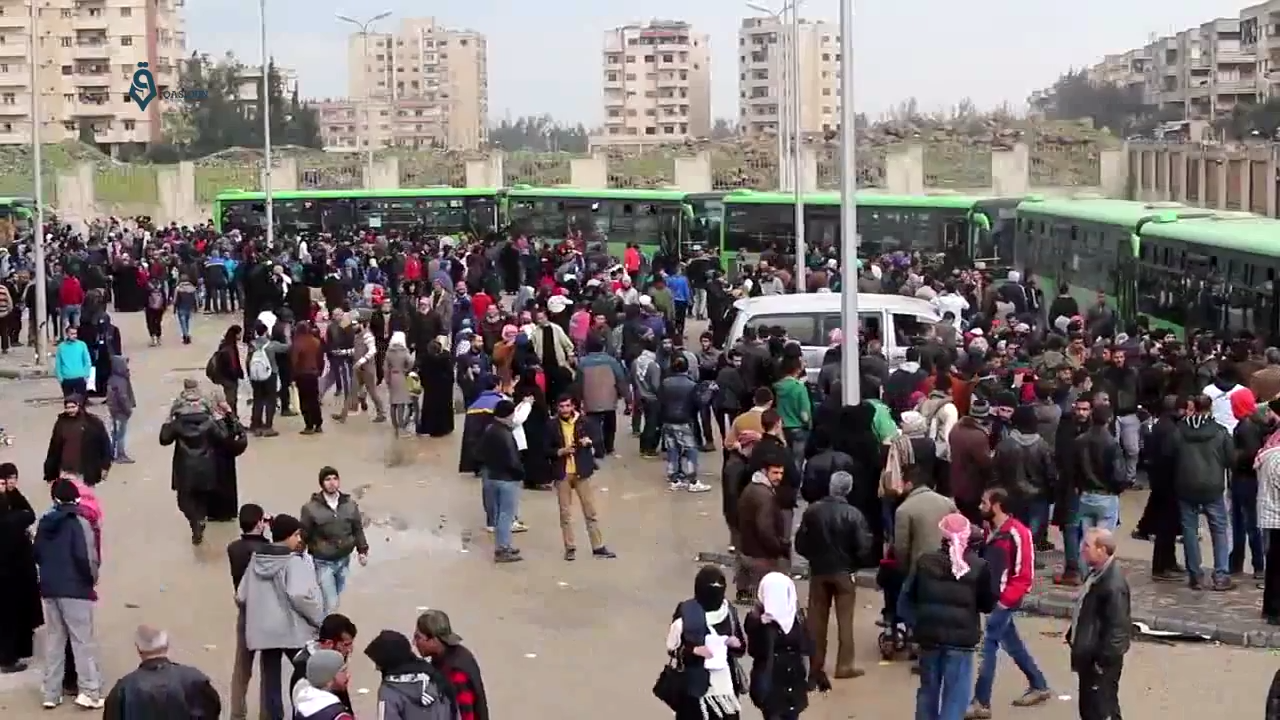
Rebels and civilians prepare to evacuate the Waer neighbourhood of Homs and head to Jarabulus after an agreement to surrender the area to government forces

Rebels and civilians who rejected the retreat deal in May 2014 concentrated in the Al-Waer neighborhood of Homs which continued to be besieged. A new surrender deal was announced 12 September 2016, that was to bring the al-Waer neighborhood under government control while evacuating about 300 rebel fighters to the northern Homs countryside. The rebels began the execution of the deal on 22 September. However, the deal was put on hold in November 2016, with Syrian Army resuming its assault on the district.

On 13 March 2017, the first batch of remaining rebels in the Waer neighbourhood agreed to leave Homs with their families and depart to Jarabulus. The evacuation of rebels along with their family members began on 18 March. On 27 March, 1,850 rebels and residents departed the neighbourhood in 45 buses. A final batch of 3,000 people, including 700 rebels, left Homs on 21 May. 1,150 rebels chose to stay and surrendered their weapons. With this, the Syrian government regained full control of Homs.

== Tactical considerations ==
During the siege, some analysts noted a shift in tactics informing the Syrian Army's subsequent general approach to war: while the army had been on the front lines during the early stages of the conflict, after the 2012 Baba Amr offensive–when it experienced heavy casualties–the new approach (tested during the Khalidiya offensive, 2013) consists of putting frontline militias in charge of dislodging the rebel forces, with the army supporting from behind with their superior armaments and air power, then asserting control once the fighting is over.

== International reactions ==
- United Nations

The U.N. Secretary-General, Ban Ki-moon says he has received "grisly reports" that Syrian government forces are arbitrarily executing, imprisoning and torturing people in Homs after opposition fighters in Bab Amr retreated.

"A major assault on Homs took place yesterday," Ban told the U.N. General Assembly in New York City on 2 March 2012. "Civilian losses have clearly been heavy. We continue to received grisly reports of summary executions, arbitrary detentions and torture. This atrocious assault is all the more appalling for having been waged by the government itself, systematically attacking its own people". Activists said that government forces were rounding up people aged between 14-50 and executing them in batches.

- France

Assad's government had "broken all the limits of barbarism". French Foreign Minister Alain Juppe said. "And when I see the Syrian president paraded around this voting station in Damascus for this phony referendum, it makes you deeply indignant," he told RTL radio. Juppe said he felt "immensely frustrated" at difficulties in obtaining security guarantees to enable wounded civilians and Western journalists to be evacuated from Homs.

In April 2012, French president, Nicolas Sarkozy, accused Syrian President Bashar al-Assad of seeking to "wipe Homs from the map", comparing his campaign to the Libyan government's attacks on the city of Benghazi. "Bashar al-Assad is lying in a shameful way, he wants to wipe Homs from the map like (former Libyan leader Muammar) Gaddafi wanted to wipe Benghazi from the map," Sarkozy said.

== In popular culture ==
- Damascus-born filmmaker Talal Derki's Return to Homs - awarded World Cinema Grand Jury Prize:Documentary, Sundance Film Festival.
- The siege is documented in the Syrian documentary film Silvered Water, Syria Self-Portrait, released in Cannes (out of competition) on 15 May 2014.
