= Sarah Jane Brown =

English activist and campaigner and spouse of the former prime minister

Sarah Brown
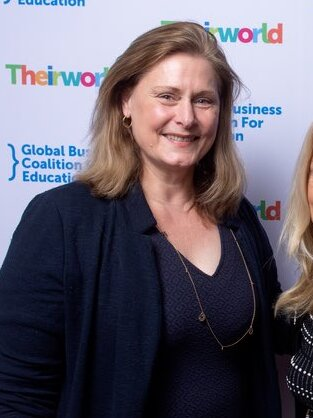
- Brown in 2023
- Born: Sarah Jane Macaulay; 31 October 1963 (age 62); Beaconsfield, Buckinghamshire, England
- Education: University of Bristol
- Known for: Spouse of the prime minister of the United Kingdom (2007–2010); Founder and president of Theirworld, a children's charity; Executive chair of the Global Business Coalition for Education; Co-founder of A World at School
- Spouse: Gordon Brown (m. 2000)
- Children: 3
- Website: gordonandsarahbrown.com

Sarah Jane Brown (née Macaulay; born 31 October 1963) is an English campaigner for global health and education, founder and president of the children's charity Theirworld, the executive chair of the Global Business Coalition for Education and the co-founder of A World at School.

She was a founding partner of Hobsbawm Macaulay Communications, a public relations company. She is married to Gordon Brown, who served as Chancellor of the Exchequer from 1997 to 2007 and Prime Minister of the United Kingdom from 2007 to 2010.

== Early life and career ==
Sarah Jane Macaulay was born in Beaconsfield, Buckinghamshire on 31 October 1963. Her mother Pauline was a teacher and her father Iain worked for publisher Longman. Macaulay spent her infancy in Fife, before her family moved to Tanzania—where her mother was to operate a school—when she was two years old. When she was eight, her parents separated and later, each remarried. Her mother, stepfather, she, and her two younger brothers, Sean and Bruce, resettled in North London.

There, she was educated at Acland Burghley Secondary School and Camden School for Girls, and later took a psychology degree at the University of Bristol.

Upon leaving university, she worked at the brand consultancy Wolff Olins. When she was thirty, she founded the public relations firm Hobsbawm Macaulay, in partnership with an old school friend, Julia Hobsbawm. Their clients included the New Statesman (owned by Geoffrey Robinson), the Labour Party and trade unions. In 2000, she married Gordon Brown, and in October 2001 left Hobsbawm Macaulay after finding out she was pregnant with her first child.

== Charitable work: public health and education advocacy ==
=== Focus on maternal, newborn and child health [MNCH] and education ===
In 2002, Brown founded the charity Theirworld – originally known as PiggyBankKids – which began as a research fund to tackle complications in pregnancy, and in 2004 the charity founded the Jennifer Brown Research Laboratory at the University of Edinburgh. The laboratory's work is notable for its unified obstetric and neonatal approach to complications in pregnancy and childbirth, with a particular focus on preterm births.

On 16 November 2015, Brown launched the Theirworld Birth Cohort project, a £1.5million study aimed at improving the health of women and their children who are born prematurely, at Edinburgh University as part of the Jennifer Brown Research Laboratory. The project will track the development of 400 babies, most of whom are born before 32 weeks, following them through to adulthood, tracking educational attainment to help identify the causes and consequences of brain injury at birth and help speed the development of new treatments that could improve the health of prematurely born babies.

Theirworld, which was launched in early 2013 through the A World at School digital movement, also has a strong focus on global education. As well as the #UpForSchool petition, it also organised the first ever "youth takeover" of the United Nations in July 2013, and has campaigned on the provision of education to children effected by conflict and disaster, particularly including refugees of the Syria crisis in Lebanon.

Brown is also the founding chair of the Global Business Coalition for Education, the objective of which is to work with business leaders and CEOs to support and galvanise international action to achieve quality education for all the world's children; she is also a member of the High Level Panel for Global Education, initiated by the coalition.

In 2008 Brown became global patron of The White Ribbon Alliance for Safe Motherhood, the grassroots led maternal health advocacy movement, and co-founded the Maternal Mortality Campaign. Her leadership on the issue has been recognised with her appointment as a member of the External Advisory Group of the world-leading Centre for Maternal and Newborn Health at the Liverpool School of Tropical Medicine, and as an adjunct professor at the Institute of Global Health Innovation at Imperial College London.

In 2009, Brown gave the keynote speech at the World Health Organization's 62nd World Health Assembly, alongside United Nations Secretary-General Ban Ki-moon. In her speech she asked "where is the M in MCH?' [maternal and child health]" in an echo of Allan Rosenfield's landmark Lancet article of 1985, highlighting that the numbers of women dying in pregnancy and childbirth were still the same approximately 20 years later.

Brown, with Bience Gawanas, was also co-chair of the leadership group on maternal and newborn mortality, launched in September 2009. Jens Stoltenberg, then Prime Minister of Norway, said "We welcome and support the establishment of this important group. Every minute a mother dies in pregnancy or childbirth... [those] women need a strong voice that will bring attention to their plight and push for the support they need."

Brown chaired the launch of the "new consensus for maternal, newborn and child health" at a 2009 high level event at the United Nations. At the meeting 10 countries, including Sierra Leone, Ghana and Liberia, declared that they would be dropping medical charges ("user fees") to pregnant women around the time of birth. The consensus also set out key action steps that research showed could save the lives of more than 10 million women and children by 2015, and that were endorsed by the G8 at their July meeting of that year.

=== #UpForSchool petition ===
In 2014, Brown helped launch A World at School's #UpForSchool petition – a global campaign started by A World at School's Global Youth Ambassadors – at a youth rally in New York City, alongside Graça Machel, Avaaz founder Ricken Patel, #BringBackOurGirls campaigner Hadiza Bela Usman, CNN anchor Isha Sesay, UN Special Envoy for Global Education Gordon Brown, and messages of support from UN secretary-general Ban Ki-moon and actor Rainn Wilson. The petition aims to hold world leaders to account for the promise of universal primary education made in the Millennium Development Goals (MDG2).

The petition mobilised support and campaigning from a wide variety of organisations and individuals. 2015 Nobel Peace Prize winner Kailash Satyarthi headlined the London launch event in November 2015. Other notable supporters and participants include his fellow Nobel Peace Prize winner, Malala Yousafzai, Justin Bieber, Archbishop Desmond Tutu, Laura Carmichael, the prime minister of the Democratic Republic of Congo, Augustin Matata Ponyo, Education International (the world teachers' union), BRAC, World Vision, Walk Free, Muslim Aid, Avaaz.org, Rovio (who created a special Angry Birds level in support of the petition), and Idara-e-Taleem-o-Aagahi in Pakistan.

As of September 2015 the petition had gathered over 10 million signatories worldwide, at which point it was presented at a joint Theirworld and UNICEF event at the New York Town Hall – a venue associated with the Suffragettes – during the UN General Assembly 2015. The singer and education campaigner Shakira also participated and presented the #UpForSchool petition signatures to the UN Special Envoy for Global Education Gordon Brown, during the same General Assembly.

=== Other activities ===
Throughout her campaigning, Brown has used social media to promote the causes of education and maternal health, and has been named on various Twitter and social media 'most influential' lists, including "The eight most influential women tweeters" by Forbes magazine, and in 2014, Brown was reported to be the second "most powerful Briton" on Twitter by The Independent.

Brown is the patron of domestic violence charity Women's Aid (from 2004, ongoing in 2013), of the SHINE Education Trust, and Honorary Patron of Maggie's Cancer Caring Centres (since 2007, ongoing in 2024).

Brown is also patron of the CBI First Women Awards, which since 2004 have celebrated "pioneering women; successful role models who have broken new ground and opened up opportunities for other women".

Brown is also a friend of writer J.K. Rowling, and the two co-authored a children's book for the One Parent Families charity organisation.

Brown's efforts to change the lives of women and children has been recognised with the Vision and Impact Award from the Global Business Coalition for Health, the Susan G. Komen for the Cure Global Leadership Award, an honorary fellowship from Royal College of Obstetricians and Gynaecologists and a recognition award from the International Federation of Gynaecology and Obstetrics, which she was awarded alongside UN Women executive director Michelle Bachelet.

In February 2015, it was announced that Sarah Brown would be competing in a second Comic Relief special edition of The Great British Bake Off television show, with The Guardian describing the line up as a "cause for celebration".

== Marriage to Gordon Brown ==
Sarah's relationship with Gordon Brown started after they shared a flight from London to Scotland for the Scottish Labour Party conference in 1994. The relationship was kept secret until June 1997, when the News of the World published a picture of them together at a restaurant in London. They were married on 3 August 2000 in Gordon Brown's hometown of North Queensferry, Fife.

On 28 December 2001, she gave birth prematurely to a baby daughter, Jennifer Jane, who died at ten days old. Gordon spoke of Sarah's bravery after their daughter's death.

On 17 October 2003, she gave birth to their second child and first son, John. Another son, James Fraser, arrived on 17 July 2006 and was diagnosed with cystic fibrosis that November.

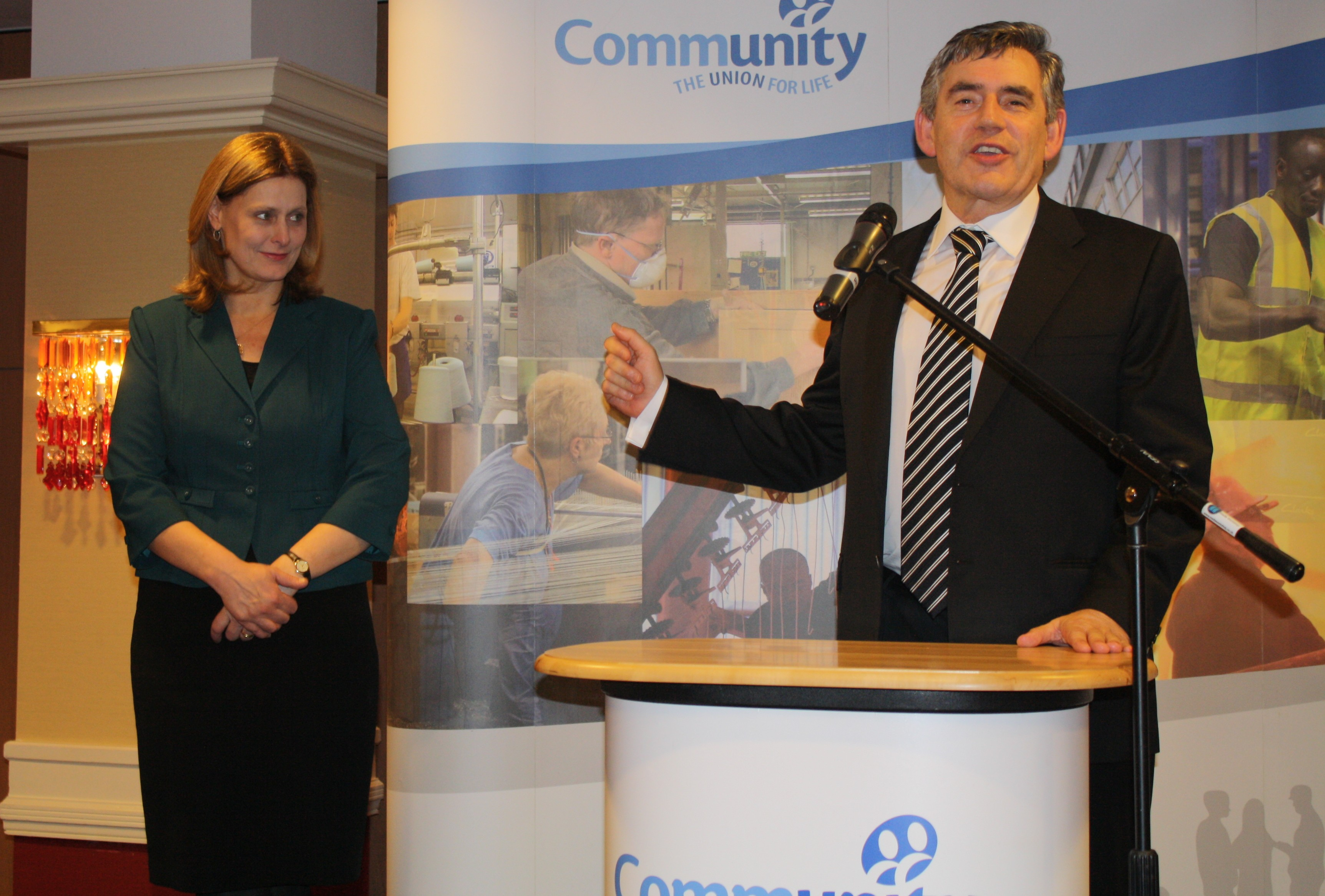
Brown with her husband at the Diversity Reception, Labour conference, 2009

=== Spouse of the Prime Minister ===
Gordon Brown became Prime Minister on 27 June 2007, following the resignation of Tony Blair. As wife of the prime minister, Sarah Brown was generally viewed favourably. The Guardian noted her public image, describing her as "a truly modern public figure: talkative, empathetic, informal but infinitely connected, ubiquitous as any celebrity, an avid exploiter of new digital media, an expert assembler of charitable and political coalitions", noting "her positive profile could be the best thing Labour has got going for it with the election looming." The Telegraph noted that " It is hard to find people with a bad word to say about Mrs Brown."

Sarah introduced Gordon at the 2008 and 2009 Labour Party Conferences. It was her idea to do so at the 2008 conference, after having seen the similar role Michelle Obama had performed for her husband, the United States president Barack Obama.

According to Anthony Seldon and Guy Lodge, the authors of a book on Gordon's tenure as prime minister, Sarah brought stability to both Gordon and his office, and was "a forceful voice in encouraging him to stay on until the very end". That end came following the 2010 General Election, which resulted in the first hung parliament since 1974. The Conservative Party led by David Cameron won the most seats, and on 11 May 2010 formed a government in coalition with the Liberal Democrats after her husband's attempts to keep Labour in power failed.

=== Memoir ===
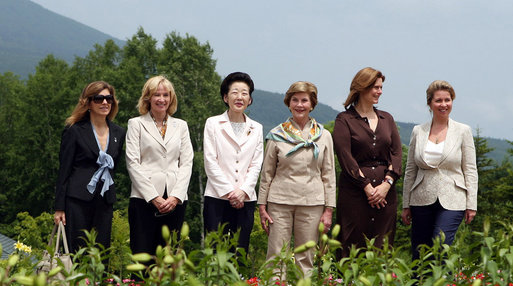
Brown with other leader spouses at the 34th G8 summit (2008)

Brown published a memoir of her role as the prime minister's spouse, entitled Behind the Black Door, through Ebury Press in 2011.

The book received a mixed reception from reviewers. Written in a diary style, the New Statesman referred to it as a "domestic take on politics". While Woman's Own called it "fascinating and endearing", the London Evening Standard described it as "perhaps the dimmest diary ever to have been professionally published" and "one long, formulaic press release in praise of Gordon Brown."

The Telegraph concludes it is a "strange book" and "plea for redemption" though the reviewer decides that Brown's description of the international charity circuit is "fun at last", and that Brown "wins sympathy that boastfulness would have forfeited."

The Irish Independent describes the book as a "disturbingly giddy, schoolgirlish, exclamation mark-littered diary form" and "nothing in the slightest bit revelatory about it... tiptoeingly discreet", but that "Brown comes across in these pages as a decent and likeable" with "enough gossipy details to satisfy star-hungry readers", with Caitlin Moran declaring: "School run, conference call, Obama for tea – Sarah Brown smiled, and tweeted, through it all. I love this woman."

The New Statesman observed that Brown successfully describes "the awkwardness of the lifestyle" and "the vagueness of the position", and that while "political events and what must have been some fairly traumatic personal moments" seem "airbrushed", leaving "the diary feeling a little empty", the book demonstrates how "collision of the political with the personal... jars and is sometimes funny", concluding it is full of "thoughtfulness and... courtesy", "precisely the sort of thing that is genuine Sarah Brown".

Commenting on some of the reaction to the book, David Mitchell noted in The Guardian that "The amount of crap we expect prime ministers' wives to endure, unpaid, for having the temerity to be married to the country's most successful politician is a national disgrace", and The Lady magazine concluded that "whatever reviewers say, she is a natural heroine to the Mumsnet demographic".

Unofficial roles
Preceded by Cherie Blair	Spouse of the Prime Minister of the United Kingdom; 2007–2010	Succeeded by Samantha Cameron
