= Al Ghassaniah Orthodox Private School =

- المدرسة الغسَانيَة الاورثودكسيَة الخاصة

Location
- Bustan Al-Dewan; Homs; Syria
- Coordinates: 34.7270°N 36.7195°E

Information
- Former name: Internal Orthodox Scientific School
- School type: Church-Based, Private
- Motto: Open Book (Arabic: كتاب مفتوح)
- Established: 1887
- Principal: Reed Nourii
- Grades: 1 to 12
- Hours in school day: Six

Al Ghassaniah Orthodox School (Arabic: المدرسة الغسَانيَة الاورثودكسيَة الخاصة) is a private school founded on 1887 in Homs, Syria. It consists of branches across Homs. The main branch is located at Bustan Al-Dewan neighborhood. The main branch teaches from the seventh grade to the twelfth grade (Middle & High School).

== Branches ==
- Bustan Al-Dewan. Grades: 7 to 12
- Al-Mahatta. Grades: 1 to 6
- Al-Hamedya. Grades: 1 to 6
- Al-Waar. Grades: 1 to 6

== History ==
In 1887, the school was established under the name Internal Orthodox Scientific School; Arabic: (المدرسة الداخلية العلمية الأرثوذكسية) by Bishop Athanasius Atallah, as a part of his on going program to develop more school for better education in Syria, especially Homs. The School became popular housing students from Palestine, Lebanon, and Southern Syria including Damascus. Bishop Athanasius Atallah sent an official letter the Ottoman Empire asking for funding for the school; no reply was sent back. On 11 May 1893, Athanasius sent a letter to The Palestinian Imperial Society, who responded quickly and sent over people to view the school capabilities and decided to take over the administration of the school in beginning of 1896.

== World War I ==
In 1914, during World War I, the school closed fearing the safety of the students. The Ottoman Army took over schools as a part of training soldiers in 1916. When the school reopened again in 1919 after the war has ended, the administration decided to increase the number of classes available. The school was then changed to its current name.

== Notable alumni ==
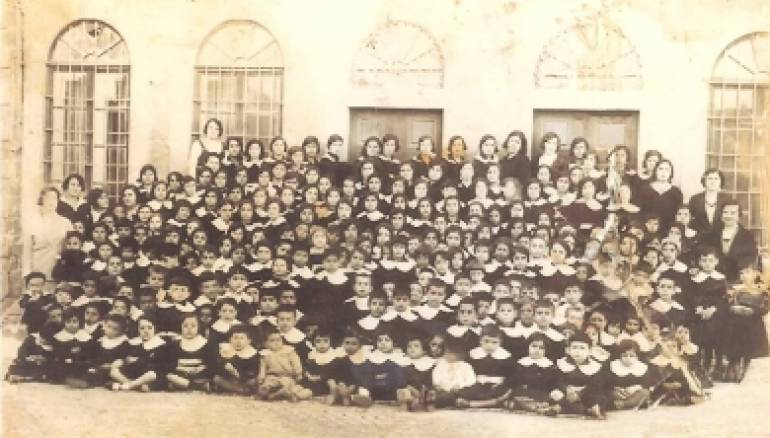
Early school Alumni

1. Metropolitan Philip

== Syrian Civil War ==
During the Syria Civil War, multiple areas of old Homs where barricaded and closed off by the Syrian Arab Army, trapping the Free Syrian Army in the Gates of Homs. These areas include but not limited to Bustan Al-Dewan, Al Hamadyia, and Bab El Sbaa. The school was taken as a base by the Free Syrian Army. When the siege ended the school was in immense damage. No official status on how much the repairs will cost in the future. However the construction on the main branch of the school has already started courtesy of the Mayor of Homs Talal Al Barazi.
