= Abdo al-Tallawi =

Syrian General (died 2011)

Abdo al Tallawi
- Born: Homs, Syria
- Died: 2011; Homs, Syria
- Military career
- Allegiance: Ba'athist Syria
- Branch: Syrian Arab Army
- Rank: General
- Conflicts: Syrian civil war: Siege of Homs

Abdo al Tallawi (Arabic: عبدو التلاوي) was a Syrian general who was killed in 2011 in the Siege of Homs during the course of the Syrian civil war. His two sons and nephew were also killed during the fighting.
