= Al-Bayadah =

Al-Bayadah البياضة
- Location within Syria
- Coordinates: 34°44′57″N 36°43′42″E
- Country: Syria
- Governorate: Homs Governorate
- District: Homs District

Population (2004)
  - Total: 35,010
- Time zone: UTC+2 (EET)
  - Summer (DST): UTC+3 (EEST)

Al-Bayadah (Arabic: البياضة, sometimes spelled Al-Bayada or Bayyada) is a quarter of Homs, the capital of Homs Governorate. In 2004 it had a population of 35,000.

While under the control of the Free Syrian Army and under attack by government forces, the neighbourhood was the site of one of the first chemical weapons attacks of the Syrian Civil War on 23 December 2012, in which approximately 100 residents were killed, most likely by Agent 15.
