= Ricken Patel =

Canadian-British activist

- Education: Oxford University, Harvard
- Occupation: Global Activist
- Writing career
- Notable work: Avaaz

Ricken Patel is a Canadian–British activist. He was from 2005 to 2021 the Founding CEO of Avaaz, an online activist network.

Patel was voted "Ultimate Gamechanger in Politics" by the Huffington Post, and listed in the world's top 100 thinkers by Foreign Policy magazine. He was also named a Young Global Leader by the World Economic Forum, referred to as "the global leader of online protest" by The Guardian and listed as one of People Magazine's most eligible bachelors.

== Early life and education ==
Patel was raised in Edmonton, Alberta, to a Kenyan-born Indian father of Gujarati origin and an English mother with Jewish heritage.

Patel studied Philosophy, Politics and Economics (PPE) at Balliol College, Oxford and has a Master's in Public Policy from Harvard's John F. Kennedy School of Government.

== Work ==
After leaving Harvard, Patel lived in Sierra Leone, Liberia, Sudan and Afghanistan, consulting for organizations including the International Crisis Group.

Prior to founding Avaaz in 2007, Patel was the founding executive director of Res Publica, a global public entrepreneurship group that worked to end genocide in Darfur and build progressive globalism in US politics, among other projects. The stated goal of Res Publica was to promote “good governance, civic virtue and deliberative democracy”. While in the US, Patel was an online member of the group MoveOn.org, from which he learned the tools of online campaigning.

In 2007, Patel founded the online campaigning organization Avaaz – with the stated goal to “close the gap between the world we have and the world most people everywhere want”. Avaaz campaigns online and off on a number of human rights, social justice, environmental, media freedom and peace and security issues. Avaaz's membership has spread to every country in the world and has more than 44 million members. Patel refers to Avaaz as a community and technology platform which "has merely given voice to a global hunger for greater democracy".

== In media ==
Patel was on the cover of May/June 2013 issue of Intelligent Life magazine.

In 2013, The Guardian referred to Avaaz as "the globe's largest and most powerful online activist network" and called Patel "the global leader of online protest."
