= Avaaz =

Nonprofit organization to promote global activism

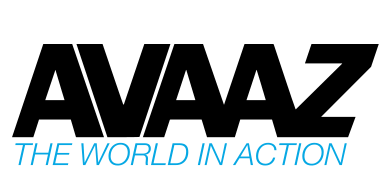
- Founded: January 2007; 19 years ago
- Purpose: Global community and political activism
- Region served: Worldwide
- Members: 68,919,190 (as of April 2, 2025)
- Website: avaaz.org

Avaaz is a US-based nonprofit organization launched in 2007 that promotes global activism on issues such as climate change, human rights, animal rights, corruption, poverty, and conflict. The word avaaz means 'voice' in several Asian and European languages. In 2012, The Guardian referred to Avaaz as "the globe's largest and most powerful online activist network".

== Founders, funding, campaigns and management ==
The founders of Avaaz in their individual capacities were Ricken Patel (CEO), Tom Perriello (Virginia state congressman), David Madden (Australian entrepreneur), Jeremy Heimans, Andrea Woodhouse, Tom Pravda, and Eli Pariser (CEO of MoveOn). The board of directors consisted of Ricken Patel (CEO), Tom Pravda (secretary), Eli Pariser (chairman of the board), and Ben Brandzel (treasurer).

On the topic of funding, The Guardian newspaper noted that "Since 2009, Avaaz has not taken donations from foundations or corporations, nor has it accepted payments of more than $5,000 (£3,100)". The newspaper described Avaaz funding as follows: "Instead, it relies simply on the generosity of individual members, who have now raised over $20m (£12.4m)." Before 2009, various foundations had funded Avaaz's staff and start-up costs.

Members are identified as anyone who visits the main web site and adds their name via the "Join" link. Alternatively, a virtual account is created for anyone who signs a petition or engages in any other action on the site, such as making a donation or starting a campaign. A virtual account is changed into a subscription via other on-line confirmation methods.

=== Global campaigns selection process ===
Avaaz global campaigns are managed by a team of campaigners working from more than 30 countries, including the UK, India, Lebanon and Brazil. These campaigners communicate with members via email; they employ campaigning tactics including online public petitions, videos, and email-your-leader tools. In some cases, Avaaz also uses advertisements; solicits legal advice on how best to take a campaign forward; and stages "sit-ins, rallies, phone-ins and media friendly stunts". One example of such a stunt is "taking a herd of cardboard pigs to the doors of the World Health Organization to demand an investigation into the link between swine flu and giant pig farms." Another example is "creating a three-mile human chain handshake from the Dalai Lama to the doors of the Chinese Embassy in London to request dialogue between the parties."

Suggestions for campaigns are contributed by members and supplemented by guidance from specialist teams. Once a suggestion has been identified as promising, tester emails are sent to 10,000 Avaaz members as a poll; if these emails receive a sufficient response, the campaign is opened to all Avaaz members. In 2010, The Economist suggested that "the way Avaaz bunches unlikely causes together may be an asset in a world where campaigns, like race and class, can still segregate people, not reconcile them".

== Politics and rationale ==
Avaaz claims to unite practical idealists from around the world. Former director Ricken Patel said in 2011: "We have no ideology per se. Our mission is to close the gap between the world we have and the world most people everywhere want. Idealists of the world unite!" In practice, Avaaz often supports causes that are considered progressive, such as calling for global action on climate change, challenging Monsanto, and building greater global support for refugees.

During the 2009 Iranian presidential election protests, Avaaz set up Internet proxy servers that allowed protesters to upload videos onto public websites.

Avaaz supported the establishment of a no-fly zone over Libya, which led to military intervention in the country in 2011. Avaaz was criticized for this pro-intervention stance in the media and blogs.

Avaaz supported the civil uprising phase of the Syrian Civil War. This support included sending $1.5 million of Internet communications equipment to protesters, as well as training activists. Later Avaaz used smuggling routes to send more than $2 million of medical equipment into rebel-held areas of Syria. Avaaz also smuggled 34 international journalists into Syria. Avaaz coordinated the evacuation of wounded British photographer Paul Conroy from Homs; thirteen Syrian activists died during this operation. Some senior members of other non-governmental organizations working in the Middle East have criticized Avaaz for taking sides in a civil war. As of November 2016, Avaaz continued campaigning for no-fly zones over Syria, particularly over Aleppo. (Gen. Dunford, Chairman of the Joint Chiefs of Staff of the United States, stated that establishing a no-fly zone would have been interpreted as starting a war against Syria and Russia.) Avaaz has received criticism from parts of the political blogosphere; up to nine percent of its users oppose the petitions, with a number of users ultimately leaving the network. The Avaaz team responded to this criticism by issuing two statements defending their decision to campaign.

During the 2016 United States presidential election, Avaaz campaigned against Donald Trump (using the slogan "Defeat Donald Trump") and developed a software tool to simplify overseas voter registration.

Avaaz opposed 21st Century Fox's bid to take over the pan-European broadcasting company Sky plc. As part of this opposition, Avaaz brought Wendy Walsh—who alleges that she was sexually harassed at Fox News—to London in May 2017 to testify for British media regulator Ofcom. In September 2017, Avaaz took legal action in the British High Court of Justice, by seeking a judicial review of Ofcom's decision not to recommend rejection of the takeover. Bloomberg described Avaaz as "the fly in the ointment of Murdoch's Sky bid". When Murdoch withdrew his bid for Sky, Ian Burrell commented that this "represents a victory for the civic activist group Avaaz, which has relentlessly campaigned against a takeover which seemed inevitable".

== Monsanto subpoena ==
In January 2018, Monsanto requested Avaaz to hand over all documents that the organization held in connection with glyphosate. Lawyers for the company said they planned to use the documentation for their own defence in an upcoming court case; this case involved two plaintiffs in the US state of Missouri, who claimed that their cancer was caused by exposure to Monsanto's Roundup herbicide. Avaaz argued that a successful subpoena would have a "chilling effect" on the group's work. On September 5, 2018, a New York judge sided with Avaaz. The judge stated that the subpoena "risked 'chilling' free speech and political activity", and he argued that Monsanto's request was "anti-democratic".

== Reception ==
Some people question whether Avaaz's focus on online petitions and email campaigns may encourage laziness, transforming potential activism into clicktivism. Canadian journalist Malcolm Gladwell objects that petition tools do not create "close-knit, disciplined and tenacious" networks of activists. In February 2012, Avaaz raised money for the evacuation of Paul Conroy from Syria, a mission that led to the deaths of 13 activists in Syria. A New Republic article accused Avaaz of making false claims about their own role in this evacuation. Jillian York has accused Avaaz of arrogance and lack of transparency. The Defensor Da Natureza's blog has accused Avaaz of taking credit for the success of the Ficha Limpa anti-corruption bill in Brazil; Luís Nassif reposted this post.

In 2008, conservative Canadian minister John Baird labelled Avaaz a "shadowy foreign organization" tied to billionaire George Soros. A Canadian conservative-media personality, Ezra Levant, tried to establish a link between Avaaz.org and Soros as an indirect supporter via MoveOn; Levant's article was later retracted as baseless, and an apology was offered to Soros.

== See also ==
- Internet activism
- Slacktivism
