= Gates of Homs =

Coordinates: 34.723185°N 36.714462°E

The Gates of Homs refer to gates of the city of Homs in central Syria. Historically under the Abbasid dynasty, the city had seven gates. They were the following:

- Bab al-Souq (Gate of the Market), thought to have been located on the southwestern corner of the al-Nouri Mosque.
- Bab Tadmur (Gate of Palmyra) located on the northeastern side of the wall.
- Bab al-Dirayb (or Bab al-Dayr) located on the eastern side of the wall.
- Bab al-Sebaa (Gate of the Lions) located east of the citadel, and leads to the Old City.
- Bab al-Turkman (Gate of the Turkmen) located on the northwestern corner of the citadel at a point where it intersects with the walls.
- Bab al-Masdoud (Closed Door) located to the north of Bab al-Turkman.
- Bab Hud (The Gate of Hud), named after the mausoleum of the prophet Hud, which lies just south of the gate.

The Ottomans tore down most of the gates in the 19th century. Only three gates (Bab Tadmor, Bab Hud and Bab al-Dreib) and a small strip of the city walls remain intact.
